= TUGZip =

- TUGZip 3.5 under Windows
- Developer(s): Christian Kindahl (known pseudonym)
- Stable release: 3.5.0.0 / 2 April 2008
- Operating system: Windows XP and later
- Type: File archiver
- License: Proprietary (Freeware)
- Website: www.tugzip.com

TUGZip is a freeware file archiver for Microsoft Windows. It handles a great variety of archive formats, including some of the commonly used ones like zip, rar, gzip, bzip2, sqx and 7z. It can also view disk image files like BIN, C2D, IMG, ISO and NRG. TugZip repairs corrupted ZIP archives and can encrypt files with 6 different algorithms.

Since the release of TUGZip 3.5.0.0, development has been suspended due to lack of time from Kindahl's side.

== Supported formats ==
TUGZip supports the following file formats:

Disc images
BIN, C2D, IMG, ISO, NRG
File archives
7z (7-zip), A, ACE (Extraction only; compression and other features can be added via Ace32.exe), ARC, ARJ, BH, BZ2, CAB, CPIO, DEB, GCA, GZ, IMP, JAR, LHA (LZH), LIB, RAR (Extraction only; compression can be added via rar.exe), RPM, SQX, TAR, TAZ, TBZ, TGZ, YZ1, ZIP, ZOO

== See also ==
- List of file archivers
- Comparison of file archivers
- InfraRecorder - An open source software from the same author
