= File Roller =

Archive manager for the GNOME desktop environment

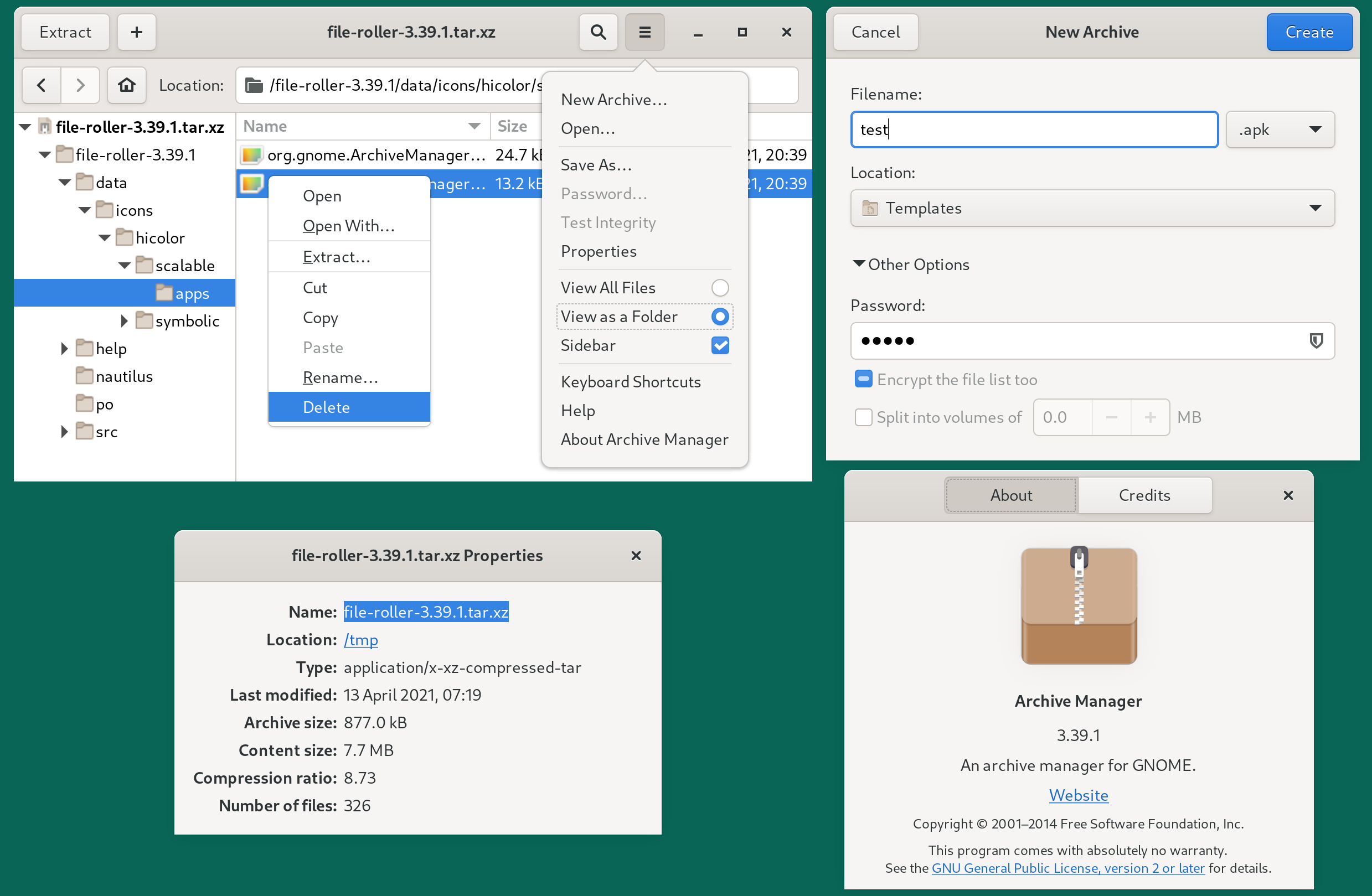
- File Roller 3.40 beta
- Developer: Paolo Bacchilega
- Release: May 12, 2001; 25 years ago
- Stable release: 44.3 / 19 May 2024; 2 years ago
- Preview release: n/a
- Written in: C
- Operating system: Unix-like
- Type: File archiver
- License: GPL-2.0-or-later
- Website: wiki.gnome.org/Apps/FileRoller
- Repository: gitlab.gnome.org/GNOME/file-roller.git

File Roller (formerly GNOME Archive Manager) is a file archiver for the GNOME desktop environment.

File Roller can:

- Create and modify archives
- View the content of an archive
- View a file contained in the archive
- Extract files from the archive

== File formats ==
Supporting the archive formats requires external back-end programs and libraries, it supports:

- 7z
- ace
- ar
- alz
- apk
- arj
- bin
- br
- bz
- bz2
- cab
- cbz
- cpio
- crx
- deb (read)
- dll
- ear
- epub
- exe
- gz
- iso (read)
- jar
- lha
- lhz
- lrz
- lz
- lz4
- lzh
- lzma
- lzo
- pkg
- rar
- rpm (read)
- rzip
- snap
- sit
- sqsh
- tar
- xar
- xip
- xz
- z
- zip
- zoo
- zst

== Limitations ==
File Roller does not give the advanced options to compress using different levels of compression via GUI (High, Normal, Low/Fast, etc.). This can be set however using dconf-editor, or the old gconf-editor on GNOME 2.

== See also ==
- Xarchiver
- Comparison of archive formats
- Comparison of file archivers
