= List of freeware =

Freeware is software that is available for use at no monetary cost or for an optional fee, but usually (although not necessarily) closed source with one or more restricted usage rights. Freeware is in contrast to commercial software, which is typically sold for profit, but might be distributed for a business or commercial purpose in the aim to expand the marketshare of a "premium" product. Popular examples of closed-source freeware include Adobe Reader, Free Studio and Skype. This is a list of notable software packages that meet the freeware definition.

== 3D artistry ==
- Anim8or
- Daz Studio

== Administration ==
=== Remote access ===
- TeamViewer

=== System monitoring and benchmarking ===
- CPU-Z
- Mactracker
- Process Explorer
- Process Monitor

=== Tweaking and configuration ===
- Tweak UI
- RivaTuner

== Audio tools ==
- Jeskola Buzz
- SoundApp
- Mp3tag
- UTAU
- Audacity

== Authoring (CD and DVD writing) ==
- CDBurnerXP
- ImgBurn

== Communications and messengers ==
- Discord
- Fluxer
- Line
- ooVoo
- Skype
- Telegram
- Trillian
- WeChat
- WhatsApp
- Windows Live Messenger
- Xfire
- Yahoo! Messenger

=== Mobile phone ===
- Disc2Phone

== Compression ==
- B1 Free Archiver
- Filzip
- LHA
- TUGZip
- ZipGenius

=== Decompression ===
- StuffIt Expander
- Zipeg

== Data recovery ==
- Recuva
- Stellar Phoenix Windows Data Recovery

== Desktop plug-ins ==
- RocketDock

== Download software ==
- CoreFTP
- FlashGet
- Free Studio
- WinMX
- μTorrent

== Email ==
- ePrompter
- Foxmail
- Pegasus Mail

== File management ==
- Xplorer² Lite

== Fractal generators ==
- Fractint

== Image manipulation ==
- Artweaver
- GIMP
- Paint.NET
- Pixia

== Image viewers ==
- FastStone Image Viewer
- IrfanView
- Jalbum
- XnView

== Information ==
- GrabIt
- Lingoes
- NetNewsWire
- ProgDVB
- Xnews

== Maintenance ==
- CCleaner
- Revo Uninstaller
- Should I Remove It?
- UltimateDefrag
- UpdateStar
- ZSoft Uninstaller

== Media manipulation and creation ==
- Any Video Converter
- Audiograbber
- DVD Shrink
- Free Studio
- GSpot
- VirtualDub

== Media players and media centers ==
- AIMP
- ALLPlayer
- foobar2000
- GOM Player
- Groove Music
- Microsoft Movies & TV
- Sonique
- Winamp
- XMPlay

== Navigation ==
- Navigational Algorithms

== PDF and printing ==
- doPDF
- Foxit Reader
- PrimoPDF
- Sumatra PDF
- PrimoPDF

== Productivity ==
- Evernote
- Windows Live Essentials

== Programming ==
- AutoIt
- HxD
- Microsoft Visual Studio Express
- Atom

== Security ==
- Comodo Internet Security
- HDDerase
- HijackThis
- K9 Web Protection
- Malwarebytes' Anti-Malware
- RootkitRevealer
- ZoneAlarm
- Citizen COP

=== Antivirus ===
- Panda Cloud Antivirus
- Avast!
- AVG

== Simulators ==
- HNSKY

=== Physics ===
- Algodoo

=== Virtual machine ===
- VMware Player
- VirtualBox
- QEMU

=== Discontinued ===
- AIDA32

== Text editors ==
- BBEdit Lite
- Codelobster
- Programmer's File Editor
- PSPad
- TED Notepad
- TextWrangler

== Web browsers ==
- Maxthon
- Opera
- QQ browser
- SlimBrowser
