= Comparison of file archivers =

This article compares several notable file archiver utilities. Unless otherwise noted, comparisons are for full release versions (not prerelease) and for installations without extra aspects such as add-ons, extensions or external programs.

== General information ==
Legend:
Free/no cost Paid Cost depends
Open source (licenses) Proprietary

File archivers	Developer	Initial release	Platform	Latest release version	Latest release date	Status	License	Cost (USD)
7-Zip	Igor Pavlov	1999-01-02	Cross-platform	26.00	2026-02-12	Active	LGPL-2.1-or-later (RAR plugin is proprietary)	No cost
ALZip	ESTsoft	1999 (Note: As a WinZip translation.)	Cross-platform	12.22	2024-02-07	Active	Proprietary	No cost (Note: A general serial number was published on developer's website altools.com in August 2012.)
Archive Manager (File Roller)	Paolo Bacchilega	2001-05-12	Cross-platform	44.3	2024-05-19	Active	GPL-2.0-or-later	No cost
Archive Utility	Apple	2003-10-24	macOS			Active	Proprietary	Bundled (Note: Included with macOS Core Services.)
Ark	KDE team	1997	Cross-platform	R14.1.2	2024-04-18	Active	GPL-2.0-or-later	No cost
B1 Free Archiver	Adam Buyer	2011-08	Cross-platform	(Android), (Linux), (macOS), (Windows)	(Android), (Linux), (macOS), (Windows)	Inactive	Proprietary	No cost
BetterZip	MacItBetter	2006-05	macOS	5.3.4	2023-04-11	Active	Proprietary	$29.95 USD
Commander One	Eltima Software	2015-08-04	macOS			Active	Proprietary	Standard at no cost. $29.95 Pro Pack.
Compressed Folders	Microsoft	1998-06-25	Windows	Windows 8.1	2013-08-27	Active	Proprietary	Bundled (Note: Included in Microsoft Windows Windows Explorer shell since Windows Me.)
Disk ARchiver	Denis Corbin	2002	Cross-platform	2.8.4	2026-03-18	Active	GPL-2.0-or-later	No cost
Expander	Haiku	2002	Haiku	R1/beta5	2024-09-13	Active	MIT	No cost
Filzip	Philipp Engel	Unknown	Windows	3.06	2006-07-19	Inactive	Proprietary	No cost
FreeArc	Bulat Ziganshin	2007-11-01	Cross-platform	0.666	2010-05-20	Inactive	GPL-2.0-only	No cost
iArchiver	Dare to be Creative Ltd.	2007-10-21	macOS	1.4.1	2008-10-30	Inactive	Proprietary	$26
Info-ZIP (Wzip)	Samuel Smith	1989-03	Cross-platform	6.0	2009-04-29	Inactive	Info-Zip	No cost
KGB Archiver	Tomasz Pawlak	2006-04-01	Cross-platform			Inactive	GPL-2.0-only	No cost
PeaZip	Giorgio Tani	2006-04-19	Cross-platform	11.0.0	2026-04-26	Active	LGPL-3.0-or-later	No cost
PKZIP	Phil Katz	1989	Cross-platform	12.4	2009-09	Active	Proprietary	$29.00
PowerArchiver	ConexWare	1999-03	macOS	2.00.01 (macOS), 22.10.02 (Windows)	2021-11-18 (macOS), 2025-12-03 (Windows)	Active	Proprietary	$22.95
StuffIt	Smith Micro Software	1987	Cross-platform	15.0.7	2011-12-01	Inactive	Proprietary	$49.99 Deluxe. $79.99 French Deluxe. Windows: $14.99 Standard. $29.99 Deluxe. $49.99 French (or German) Deluxe. No cost for expander.
TAR	AT&T	1979, 1987 (pdtar), 1997 (star)	Cross-platform	3.5.2 (BSD tar), 1.35 (GNU tar), 1.6.0 (star)	2021-08-23 (BSD tar), 2023-07-18 (GNU tar), 2019-04-15 (star)	Active	BSD-2-Clause (BSD tar), GPL-3.0-or-later (GNU tar), public domain (pdtar), CDDL-1.0 (star)	No cost
The Unarchiver	Circlesoft	2006-07-01	Cross-platform	4.3.8	2024-05-16	Active	Proprietary	No cost
Terse	IBM	1984-07-01				Active	Proprietary	No cost
TUGZip	Christian Kindahl	2002-08-18	Windows	3.5.0.0	2008-04-02	Inactive	Proprietary	No cost
WinAce	e-merge GmbH	Unknown	Windows	2.69i	2008-02-26	Inactive	Proprietary	$29.00 Standard. $39.00 Plus. No cost for expander. (Note: Linux & macOS only.)
WinRAR	Eugene Roshal; Alexander Roshal	1993	Cross-platform	7.20	2026-02-04	Active	Proprietary	$29. No cost for expander.
WinZip	WinZip Computing, Inc	1991	Cross-platform	6.9.0 (Android), 7.11 (iOS), 10.0.6204 (macOS), 27.0.15240 (Windows)	2023-06-12 (Android), 2023-06-26 (iOS), 2023-03-21 (macOS), 2022-08-23 (Windows)	Active	Proprietary	$29.95 Standard. $49.95 Pro.
XAD (XADMaster.library)	Dirk Stoecker	1998	Cross-platform	13.1		Inactive	Proprietary	Shareware; No cost for non-commercial use.
Xarchiver	Giuseppe Torelli	Unknown	Cross-platform	0.5.4.26	2025-09-01	Active	GPL-2.0-or-later	No cost
ZipGenius	Matteo Riso of M.Dev Software	2003-05	Windows			Active	Proprietary	No cost
ZPAQ	Matt Mahoney	2009-03	Cross-platform	7.15	2016-09-22	Active	Public domain MIT	No cost
File archivers	Developer	Initial release	Platform	Latest release version	Latest release date	Status	License	Cost (USD)

== Operating system support ==
The following table identifies the operating systems that archivers can run on directly – without emulation or a compatibility layer.

File archivers	Windows	DOS	macOS	Linux	BSD	Other Unix	AmigaOS	Android	Windows Mobile	Windows Phone
7-Zip	Yes (Note: A separate 64-bit Windows x64 Edition version is also available.)	Command-line interface (Note: The Unix-like system port is known as p7zip. p7zip also is provided by FreeDOS.)	Yes	Command-line interface	Command-line interface	Command-line interface	Command-line interface	No	Yes	No
ALZip	Yes	Command-line interface	No	No	No	No	No	No	No	No
ALZip for Mac	No	No	Yes	No	No	No	No	No	No	No
Archive Manager	No	No	No	Yes	Yes	Yes	No	No	No	No
Archive Utility	No	No	Yes	No	No	No	No	No	No	No
Ark	No	No	No	Yes	Yes	Yes	No	No	No	No
B1 Free Archiver	Yes	No	Yes	Yes	Yes	Yes	No	Yes	No	No
BetterZip	No	No	Yes	No	No	No	No	No	No	No
bsdtar/libarchive	Yes, bundled (Note: Bundled with Windows 10 since insider build 17063)	No	Yes, bundled	Yes	Yes, bundled	Yes	Partial	Unknown	Unknown	No
Commander One	No	No	Yes	No	No	No	No	No	No	No
Disk ARchiver	Yes	No	Yes	Yes	Yes	Yes	No	No	No	No
Filzip	Yes	No	No	No	No	No	No	No	No	No
FreeArc	Yes	No	No	Yes	Yes	Yes	No	No	No	No
GNU tar	Yes	No	Yes	Yes	Yes	Yes	Yes	Yes	No	No
iArchiver	No	No	Yes	No	No	No	No	Unknown	Unknown	?
Info-ZIP	Yes	Yes	Yes	Yes	Yes	Yes (Note: Also Acorn RISC OS, Atari, MVS, OS/2, VM/CMS, VMS and others.)	Yes	No	Yes (Note: General Windows CE version.)	No
KGB Archiver	Yes (Note: This program also has a POSIX version available.)	Partial	Command-line interface	Yes	No	No	No	Yes	Unknown	?
PeaZip	Yes	No	Yes	Yes	Yes	No	No	Unknown	Unknown	?
PKZIP	Yes	Yes	No	Yes	No	Yes	Yes	Unknown	Unknown	?
PowerArchiver	Yes	Unknown	Yes	No	No	No	No	Unknown	Unknown	?
Star	Yes	No	Yes	Yes	Yes	Yes	Yes	Yes	Unknown	?
StuffIt	Yes	Unknown	Yes	X86 only, older version (5.2.0?)	No	older version (5.2.0?)	No	Unknown	Unknown	?
The Unarchiver	Command-line interface	No	Yes	Command-line interface	No	No	No	Unknown	No	?
TUGZip	Yes	Unknown	No	No	No	No	No	Unknown	Unknown	?
WinAce	Yes	Command-line interface (Note: The programs for other platforms are called Unace, do not have the same GUI, and can only perform decompression.)	Command-line interface expander only	X86, Command-line interface expander only	No	No	Command-line interface expander only	Unknown	Unknown	?
WinRAR and RAR	Yes	Yes	Command-line interface (Note: WinRAR is for Windows, RAR for other platforms.)	X86 and x86-64, Command-line interface	Command-line interface	Command-line interface	Command-line interface expander only	Yes	Yes	?
WinZip	Yes	Command-line interface	Yes	No	No	No	Yes	Yes	Unknown	?
XAD	No	No	No	Yes	Yes	Yes	Yes	Unknown	Unknown	?
Xarchiver	No	No	No	Yes	Yes	Unknown	Unknown	Unknown	Unknown	?
ZipGenius	Yes	Unknown	No	No	No	No	No	Unknown	Unknown	?
ZPAQ	Yes	Unknown	Yes	Yes	No	No	No	Unknown	Unknown	?
	Windows	DOS	macOS	Linux	BSD	Unix	AmigaOS	Android	Windows Mobile	Windows Phone

== Archiver features ==
The following table indicates which archivers implement various archiver features natively – without third-party add-ons.

File archivers	Data compression	Shell integration	Password protection	Multiple volumes	Self extraction	File repairing	Batch conversion	Unicode file / directory names (Note: Extracting/adding file and/or directory names into archive in either UTF-7, UTF-8 or UTF-16/UCS-2 encoding to support single file/directory name which contains characters from different languages. More recent versions of the zip file format have support for Unicode filenames.)	Encryption	Filename Encryption
7-Zip	Yes	Yes	Yes	Yes	Yes	No	Yes	Yes	Yes	Yes
ALZip	Yes	Yes	Yes	Yes	Yes	Yes	Yes (Note: Commandline batch compression is available only for ZIP and ALZ formats.)	No	Unknown	Unknown
Archive Manager	Yes	Yes	Yes	Yes	No	No	No	Yes	Yes	Yes
Archive Utility	Yes	Yes	No	Unknown	No	No	Yes	Yes	Unknown	Unknown
ARJ	Yes	Yes	Yes	Yes	Yes	Yes	Yes	Unknown	Unknown	Unknown
Ark	Yes	Yes	Yes	Yes	No	No	No	Yes	Yes	Yes
B1 Free Archiver	Yes	Yes	Yes	Yes	No	Yes	Yes	Yes	Yes	Yes
BetterZip	Yes	Yes	Yes	Yes	No	No	No	Yes	Yes	Yes
bsdtar/libarchive	non-tar formats (Note: Traditionally, tar, cpio, or pax calls the external programs gzip and bzip2 to perform compression; these external programs usually come with systems that contain the archiver. This is the case for GNU tar. BSD tar uses its own implementation, since it also has to deal with archive formats that do their own compression.)	Yes	zip	Yes	No	No	Yes	Yes	7z, zip, rar	7z, zip, rar
Commander One	Yes	No	Yes	No	No	No	Yes	Yes	Unknown	Yes for 7z
Disk ARchiver	Yes	Yes	Yes	Yes	No	Yes	Yes	Yes	Yes	Yes
Filzip	Yes	Yes	Yes	Unknown	Yes	No	No	Unknown	Unknown	Unknown
FreeArc	Yes	Yes	Yes	No	Yes	Yes	Yes	Yes	Yes	Yes
GNU tar	No	Yes	No	Yes	No	Separate	Yes	Yes	Unknown	Unknown
iArchiver	Yes	No	Yes	Yes	No	No	No	Yes	Unknown	Unknown
Info-ZIP	Yes	No (Note: Many shells have built-in zip file support. Windows Explorer has "Send To"->"ZIP-compressed folder".)	Yes	Yes (Note: Unicode and volumes since version 3.0 (2008). AES since 3.1 (in beta).)	Yes	Yes	Yes	Yes	ZipCrypto (weak) and AES	No
KGB Archiver	Yes	Not enabled by default	Yes	Unknown	Yes	No	No	Yes	Yes	Unknown
PeaZip	Yes	Yes	Yes	Yes	Yes	Yes	Yes	Yes (Note: UTF-8 file/path-names support was completed in release 3.0.1 on Unix systems, and in release 5.8.0 on Windows systems. GUI UTF-8 support for full internationalization of the application was completed in release 2.2.0. Optionally, extended characters can be set to be replaced by jolly "?" character for exporting scripts to legacy systems; scripts creation screen informs if commands are ANSI-safe, OEM-codepage-safe (on Windows), or requires UTF-8 compliant environment to run (system, command interpreter, etc).)	Yes (Note: Command-line batch compression and expansion requires free add-on software downloaded from the WinZip website.)	Yes
PKZIP	Yes	Yes	Yes	No	Separate	Separate	No	Yes	Yes	Unknown
PowerArchiver	Yes	Yes	Yes	Yes	Yes	Yes	Yes (Note: Does support Unicode names, but not under the default (initial) option settings: the user must tick "Use OEM conversion for filenames" under "General" on the "Miscellaneous" tab in the Configuration dialog to enable Unicode name support. Full support for Unicode files names by default is supported only for 7-Zip and RAR archive formats.)	Yes	Yes	Yes
StuffIt	Yes	Yes	Yes	Unknown	Yes	Yes	Yes	Yes	Yes	Unknown
The Unarchiver	No (Note: Application is only for decompression.)	some formats	Yes	Yes	Yes	Yes	Yes	Yes	Yes	Unknown
TUGZip	Yes	Yes	Yes	Yes	Yes	Yes	Yes	No	Yes	Unknown
WinAce	Yes	Yes	Yes	Yes	Yes	Yes	Yes	No	Yes	Unknown
WinRAR and RAR	Yes	Yes	Yes	Yes	Yes	Yes (Note: Allows for a variable amount of error correction. See also RAR (file format).)	Yes	Yes (Note: In WinRAR 3.60, when opening 7-Zip archives which contains Unicode file/directory names, they will not be displayed correctly. There will be no problem extracting them, however.)	Yes	Yes
WinZip	Yes	Yes	Yes	Yes	Yes	Yes	Yes	Yes	Yes	Yes
XAD	No	Yes	Yes	Unknown	Yes	Unknown	Unknown	Unknown	Unknown	Unknown
Xarchiver	Yes	Yes	Yes	Unknown	Yes	Unknown	Unknown	Unknown	Unknown	Unknown
ZipGenius	Yes	Yes	Yes	Unknown	Yes	Unknown	Yes	No	Unknown	Unknown
ZPAQ	Yes	Unknown	Yes	Yes	No	Unknown	Unknown	Yes	Yes	Unknown
	Data compression	Shell integration	Password protection	Multiple volumes	Self extraction	File repairing	Batch conversion	Unicode file / directory names	Encryption	Filename Encryption

== Archive format support ==
=== Reading ===
The following table identifies the archive formats that each archiver can read. Note that gzip, bzip2 and xz are compression formats rather than archive formats.

File archivers	ZIP	TAR	GZ	BZ/BZ2	7z	XZ	RAR	LHA/LZH	ACE	SIT	SITX	ARJ	KGB	DAR	ARC	CAB	ALZ	ISO/CD Image	ZPAQ
7-Zip	Yes	Yes	Yes	Yes	Yes	Yes	Yes	Yes	No (Note: Used to, but no longer does, due to technical and legal issues.)	No	No	Yes	No	No	No	Yes	No	Yes	No
ALZip	Yes	Yes	Yes	Yes	Yes	Unknown	Yes	Yes	Yes	No	No	Yes	No	No	Yes	Yes	Yes	Yes	No
TAR	No	Yes	No	No	No	No	No	No	No	No	No	No	No	No	No	No	No	No	No
Archive Utility	Yes	Yes	Yes	Yes	No	Yes	No	No	No	No	No	No	No	No	No	No	No	No (Note: Archive Utility itself is unable to open ISO files, but Disk Utility, which also comes with macOS, is able to mount them as virtual disks.)	No
Ark	Yes	Yes	Yes	Yes	Yes	Yes	Yes	Yes	No	Yes	Yes	Yes	Yes	No	Yes	Yes	Yes	Yes	No
B1 Free Archiver	Yes	Yes	Yes	Yes	Yes	No	Yes	Yes	No	No	No	No (Note: B1 Free Archiver for Android and B1 Online Archiver support ARJ format.)	No	No	No	Yes	Yes	Yes	No
BetterZip	Yes	Yes	Yes	Yes	Yes	No	Yes	Yes	No	Yes	No	Yes	No	No	No	Yes	No	Yes	No
bsdtar/libarchive	Yes	Yes	Yes (Note: Supports these formats as compression stream of other archive formats like tar.bz2 or iso.xz but does not support the format as an archive itself, as they are not archive formats. See the above explanation for tar.)	Yes	Yes	Yes	Partial (Note: libarchive has issues reading RAR formats, some partial reads are unsupported hence broken for generic usage.)	Yes	No	No	No	No	No	No	No	Yes	No	Yes	No
cpio	No	Yes	No	No	No	No	No	No	No	No	No	No	No	No	No	No	No	No	No
Commander One	Yes	Yes	Yes	Yes	Yes	No	Yes	No	No	No	No	No	No	No	No	No	No	No	No
Disk ARchiver	No	Yes	Yes	Yes	No	Yes	No	Yes	No	No	No	No	No	Yes	No	No	No	No	No
Filzip	Yes	Yes	Yes	No	No	Unknown	Yes	Yes	Yes	No	No	Yes	No	No	Yes	Yes	No	No	No
FreeArc	Yes	Yes	Yes	Yes	Yes	Unknown	Yes	Yes	No	No	No	Yes	No	No	No (Note: FreeARC uses .arc as its filename extension, but this format is not the same as the traditional ARC file.)	Yes	No	Yes	No
GNU tar^{[2]}	No (Note: Tar implementations call external programs (like compress, gzip or bzip2 or any other programs working with abstract streams and supporting the "-d" option) to perform (de)compression, and allowing you to implement your own filters. (Note: GNU tar lets you implement your own filters, allowing you to use other compression programs (p7zip, ...) and filters (GPG, ...).) These external programs may be shipped with your operating system.)	Yes	Yes	Yes	No	Yes	No	No	No	No	No	No	No	No	No	No	No	No	No
iArchiver	Yes	Yes	Yes	Yes	Yes	Unknown	Yes	Yes	Yes	Yes	No	Yes	No	No	No	Yes	No	No	No
Info-ZIP	Yes	No	No	No	No	No	No	No	No	No	No	No	No	No	No	No	No	No	No
KGB Archiver	Yes	No	No	No	No	Unknown	No	No	No	No	No	No	Yes	No	No	No	No	No	No
PeaZip	Yes	Yes	Yes	Yes	Yes	Yes	Yes	Yes	Yes	No	No	Yes	No	No	Yes	Yes	No	Yes	Yes
PKZIP	Yes	Yes	Yes	Yes	Yes	Unknown	Yes	Yes	No	No	No	Yes	No	No	Yes	Yes	Yes	Yes	No
PowerArchiver	Yes	Yes	Yes	Yes	Yes	Unknown	Yes	Yes	Yes	No	No	Yes	No	No	Yes	Yes	No	Yes	Yes
Star	No	Yes	Yes	Yes	Yes	Yes	No	No	No	No	No	No	No	No	No	No	No	No	No
StuffIt	Yes	Yes	Yes	Yes	Yes	Unknown	Yes	Yes	No	Yes	Yes	Yes	No	No	Yes	Yes	Yes	Yes	No
The Unarchiver	Yes	Yes	Yes	Yes	Yes	Yes	Yes	Yes	Partial	Yes	Partial (Note: Only partial support for reading proprietary SITX format.)	Yes	No	No	Yes	Yes	Yes	Yes	No
TUGZip	Yes	Yes	Yes	Yes	Yes	Unknown	Yes	Yes	Yes	No	No	Yes	No	No	Yes	Yes	No	Yes	No
WinAce	Yes	Yes	Yes	No	No	Unknown	Yes	Yes	Yes	No	No	Yes	No	No	Yes	No	No	Yes	No
WinRAR	Yes	Yes	Yes	Yes	Yes	Yes	Yes	Yes	No	No	No	Yes	No	No	No	Yes	No	Yes	No
WinZip	Yes	Yes	Yes	Yes	Yes	Unknown	Yes (Note: Starting from version 11.)	Yes	No	No	No	Yes (Note: Requires external program.)	No	No	Yes	Yes	No	Yes	No
XAD	Yes	Yes	Yes	Yes	No	Unknown	Yes	Yes	Partial	Yes	No	No	No	No	Yes	Yes	Yes	Yes	No
Xarchiver	Yes	Yes	Yes	Yes	Yes	Yes	Yes	Yes	No	Yes	Yes	Yes	No	No	No	Yes	No	Yes	No
ZipGenius	Yes	Yes	Yes	Yes	Yes	Unknown	Yes	Yes (Note: Requires external program.)	Yes	No	No	Yes	No	No	Yes	Yes	No	Yes	No
	ZIP	TAR	GZ	BZ/BZ2	7z	XZ	RAR	LHA/LZH	ACE	SIT	SITX	ARJ	KGB	DAR	ARC	CAB	ALZ	ISO/CD Image	ZPAQ

=== Writing ===
The following table identifies the archive formats that each archiver (Note: The Extractor and XAD are not included in this list because they only expand archives.) can write and create. Note that gzip, bzip2 and xz are compression formats rather than archive formats.

File archivers	ZIP	TAR	GZ	BZ2	7z	XZ	RAR	LHA/LZH	ACE	SIT	SITX	ARJ	KGB	DAR	ARC	CAB	ALZ	ISO/CD Image	ZPAQ	Special
7-Zip	Yes	Yes	Yes (Note: If there are more than one, files must be grouped in a .tar before being compressed.)	Yes	Yes	Yes	No	No	No	No	No	No	No	No	No	No	No	No	No	
ALZip (Note: ALZip can also write to the following formats: BH, JAR, and LZH)	Yes	Yes	Yes	Yes	No	Unknown	No	No	No	No	No	No	No	No	No	Yes	Yes	Unknown	No	
Archive Manager	Yes	Yes	Yes	Yes	Yes	Yes	No (Note: Archive Manager (previously known as "File Roller") is a front-end only and requires appropriate command-line programs be installed. Programs like bzip2, gzip, tar, zip usually come with systems that contain Archive Manager. writing in .rar format requires a commercial program.)	Yes	Unknown	Unknown	Unknown	Yes	Unknown	Unknown	Unknown	Unknown	Unknown	No	No	
Archive Utility	Yes	No	No	No	No	Unknown	No	No	No	No	No	No	No	No	No	No	No	No	No	
Ark	Yes	Yes	Yes	Yes	Yes	Yes	No (Note: Ark is a front-end only and requires appropriate command-line programs be installed. Programs like bzip2, gzip, tar, zip usually come with systems that contain Ark; writing in .rar format requires a commercial program.)	Yes	No	No	No	No	No	No	No	No	No	No	No	
B1 Free Archiver	Yes	No	No	No	No	No	No	No	No	No	No	No	No	No	No	No	No	No	No	
BetterZip	Yes	Yes	Yes	Yes	Yes	No	Yes	No	No	No	No	No	No	No	No	No	No	No	No	
bsdtar/libarchive	Yes	Yes	Yes (Note: supports the formats as stream compression of other archive format and can create compressed format like tar.bz2 or iso.xz but cannot create an archive in these formats)	Yes	Yes	Yes	No	No	No	No	No	No	No	No	No	No	No	Yes	No	
Commander One	Yes	Yes	No	No	Yes	No	No	No	No	No	No	No	No	No	No	No	No	No	No	
Disk ARchiver	No	Yes	Yes	Yes	No	Yes	No	No	No	No	No	No	No	Yes	No	No	No	No	No	
Filzip	Yes	Yes	Yes	No	No	Unknown	No	Yes	No	No	No	No	No	Unknown	Unknown	Unknown	Unknown	Unknown	No	
FreeArc	Yes	No	No	No	Yes	No	No	No	No	No	No	No	No	No	Yes	No	No	No	No	
GNU tar	No	Yes	Yes (Note: Tar implementations call the external programs gzip and bzip2, 7z, xz, ... to perform compression; these external programs usually come with systems that contain tar.)	Yes	No	Yes	No	No	No	No	No	No	No	No	No	No	No	No	No	
iArchiver	Yes	Yes	Yes	Yes	Yes	Unknown	No	No	No	No	No	No	No	No	No	No	No	No	No	
Info-ZIP	Yes	No	No	No	No	No	No	No	No	No	No	No	No	No	No	No	No	No	No	
KGB Archiver	Yes	No	No	No	No	Unknown	No	No	No	No	No	No	Yes	Unknown	Unknown	Unknown	Unknown	Unknown	No	
PeaZip	Yes	Yes	Yes	Yes	Yes	Yes	No	No	No	No	No	No	No	No	Yes	No	No	No	Yes	
PKZIP	Yes	Yes	Yes	Yes	No	Unknown	No	No	No	No	No	No	No	Unknown	Unknown	Unknown	Unknown	Unknown	No	
PowerArchiver	Yes	Yes	Yes	Yes	Yes	Yes	Yes (Note: it require console rar.exe, and the path to it -- specified in Options . it can be taken from WinRAR software . PowerArchiever also doesn't support separate definition of the Dictionary Size and Compression Method .)	Yes	No	No	No	No	No	No	No	Yes	No	No	Yes	.bh (BlakHole) by ZipTV
Star	No	Yes	Yes	Yes	Yes	Yes	No	No	No	No	No	No	No	No	No	No	No	No	No	
StuffIt	Yes	Yes	Yes	Yes	No	Unknown	No (Note: Stuffit supported file formats)	Yes	No	Yes	Yes	No	No	Unknown	Unknown	Unknown	Unknown	Unknown	No	
TUGZip	Yes	Yes	Yes	Yes	Yes	Unknown	No (Note: Requires rar.exe from WinRAR.)	Yes	No (Note: Requires Ace32.exe from WinAce.)	No	No	No	No	No	No	Yes	No	Unknown	No	
WinAce	Yes	Yes	Yes	Yes	No	Unknown	No	Yes	Yes	No	No	No	No	Unknown	Unknown	Yes	Unknown	Yes	No	
WinRAR	Yes	No	No	No	No	No	Yes	No	No	No	No	No	No	No	No	No	No	No	No	
WinZip	Yes	No	No	No	No	No	No	No	No	No	No	No (Note: Requires external program(if you are using WinZip 11.1 or earlier).)	No	No	No	No	No	No	No	ZIPx
Xarchiver	Yes	Yes	Yes	Yes	Yes	Yes	No (Note: Xarchiver is a front-end only and requires appropriate command-line programs be installed. Programs like bzip2, gzip, tar, zip usually come with systems that contain Xarchiver; writing in .rar format requires a commercial program.)	Yes	No	Unknown	Unknown	Yes	Unknown	Unknown	Unknown	Unknown	Unknown	Unknown	No	
ZipGenius	Yes	Yes (Note: Updating archives is not supported.)	Yes	Yes	Yes	Unknown	No	Yes (Note: Requires external program.)	No	No	No	No	No	No	Unknown	Yes	No	No	No	
	ZIP	TAR	GZ	BZ2	7z	XZ	RAR	LHA/LZH	ACE	SIT	SITX	ARJ	KGB	DAR	ARC	CAB	ALZ	ISO/CD Image	ZPAQ	Special

=== Uncommon archive format support ===
PeaZip has full support for Brotli, Zstandard, various LPAQ and PAQ formats, QUAD / BALZ / BCM (highly efficient ROLZ based compressors), FreeArc format, and for its native PEA format.

7-Zip includes read support for .msi, cpio and xar, plus Apple's dmg/HFS disk images and the deb/.rpm package distribution formats; beta versions (9.07 onwards) have full support for the LZMA2-compressed .xz format.

== See also ==
- Comparison of archive formats
- Lossless compression benchmarks
- Comparison of file systems
- List of archive formats
- List of file systems
