= IArchiver =

File-compression and archive utility software for macOS

iArchiver
- Creating an archive with iArchiver
- Developer: Dare to be Creative Ltd.
- Release: October 21, 2007; 18 years ago
- Stable release: 1.4.1 / October 30, 2008; 17 years ago
- Written in: Objective-C
- Operating system: Mac OS X
- Available in: English, French, German
- Type: File archiver
- License: Shareware
- Website: Rucksack

iArchiver is a software utility for handling file archives on the Apple Macintosh. It was renamed Rucksack, and then simply Archiver.

iArchiver was designed as a universal tool for working with archives, and can be used to create, extract and convert a large number of common and legacy archive formats with a drag-and-drop interface.

iArchiver's main purpose is to create, open, and change various archive types.

iArchiver was developed and is currently being maintained by Dare to be Creative Ltd., a software company based in Vienna, Austria.

== Features ==
- Creating archives in formats common on MacOS, Windows and Linux platforms
- Encrypting archives in ZIP and 7z formats
- Opening archives in both common and legacy formats (such as TAR, RAR, ACE, ARJ, Cabinet, SIT, HQX and PAX)
- Converting between archive formats (for example, RAR to ZIP)

== See also ==
- Comparison of file archivers
