= Xarchiver =

Free GUI for several compression tools

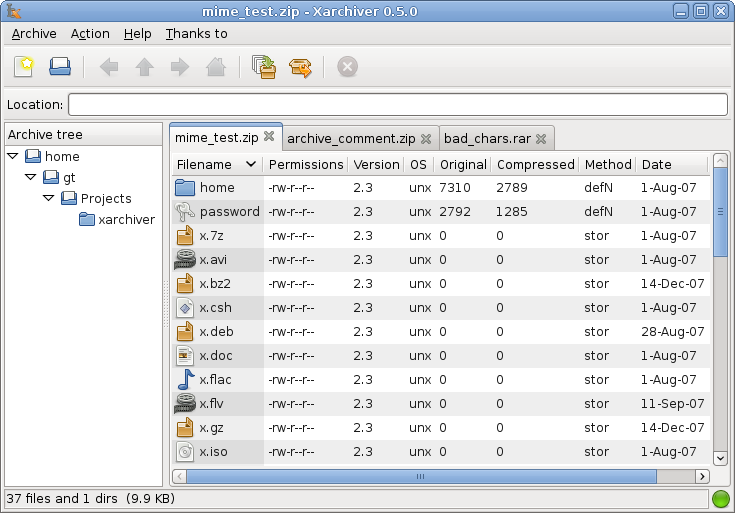
- Developer: Ingo Brückl
- Initial release: June 2006 (0.1.0)
- Stable release: 0.5.4.26 / 1 September 2025
- Repository: github.com/ib/xarchiver
- Written in: C
- Operating system: Unix-like
- Type: File archiver
- License: GPL-2.0-or-later
- Website: github.com/ib/xarchiver

Xarchiver is a front-end to various command line archiving tools for Linux and BSD operating systems, designed to be independent of the desktop environment. It is the default archiving application of Xfce and LXDE. Deepin's archive manager is based on Xarchiver.

It uses the GTK+2 or GTK3 toolkit to provide the program interface; therefore, it is capable of running on any system where GTK support exists. Many other applications also use the toolkit, so support is widespread among other Linux distributions, irrespective of their specific desktop solution.

Supported formats at this time with an appropriate installed program are 7z, static libraries, apk, arj, bzip, bzip2, bzip3, cab, cb7, cbr, cbt, cbz, chm, compress, cpio, deb, docx, epub, exe (self-extracting), fbz, gzip, iso, jar, jsonlz4, lha, lzh, lrz, lz, lz4, lzma, lzop, mozlz4, odt, oxt, rar, rpm, rzip, snap, squashfs, tar, xpi, xz, zip, zpaq and zstd.

It handles encrypted *.7z, *.arj, *.lrz, *.rar and *.zip archives.

Xarchiver uses the Direct Save Protocol XDS for drag and drop file saving. The program acts as a front-end for various commonly installed libraries dealing with the supported compression formats. Xarchiver can't create archives whose archiver is not installed.

Currently, the Xfce master branch of Xarchiver is being continued at GitHub.

== See also ==
- Comparison of file archivers
