= WinAce =

Legacy archiving app for Windows

- WinAce version 2.69
- Developer: e-merge GmbH
- Initial release: 22 July 1999; 26 years ago
- Final release: 2.69i / 21 January 2011; 15 years ago
- Operating system: Windows, DOS, (read only: Linux, Mac OS X)
- Type: File archiver
- License: Adware

WinAce is a discontinued archiving app for Windows. It works primarily with the eponymous ACE archive format but supports ZIP, RAR and CAB. The app is not free, but its developer also developed a freeware, CLI app called Unace for macOS and Linux that extracts archive files.

Beginning with version 2.65, WinAce was bundled with the WhenU SaveNow adware program. This bundle was removed from the last version (2.69) and had been replaced with an opt-in sponsorship deal via TrialPay.

Commandline ACE for DOS, sporting a text-based user interface (TUI)

There is a version of the app for the DOS operating system, called Commandline ACE. Its title, however, is misnomer because the app sports a text-based user interface (TUI) that emulates the color theme of Norton Commander. In addition to the ACE format, it supports ARJ, RAR, ZIP, and LZH (partial) archive formats.

Commandline ACE ships with a copy of Unace. Both apps support DOS, OS/2 and Windows operating systems, and recognize long filenames. Commandline ACE could be used for file management.

== See also ==
- Comparison of file archivers
