= Filzip =

File archiver software

- Filzip 3.06 running on Windows 10 Technical Preview
- Developer: Philipp Engel
- Final release: 3.06 / 19 July 2006
- Preview release: none (n/a) [±]
- Written in: Delphi
- Operating system: Microsoft Windows
- Platform: IA-32
- Available in: English
- Type: File archiver
- License: Proprietary (Freeware)
- Website: www.filzip.com

Filzip is a freeware file archiver program for the Microsoft Windows platform.

It was written by Philipp Engel. While free, the author does request donations to help the cost of development and reward him for his work. As of March 2019, no new version has been released since version 3.0.6. Filzip has been presumed unmaintained the software development.

== Features ==
The program has been localized to more than twenty languages.

Filzip supports seven different archive formats, allowing the user to add and extract files from the archives. These include ZIP, BH, CAB, JAR, LHA (LZH), TAR, and gzip. A handful of other formats are supported for extraction only, including ACE, ARC, ARJ, RAR, and ZOO.

Files within most formats can be viewed without explicitly unpacking them, and can be removed or renamed within the archive. ZIP files may be spanned; that is, written to any number of files with a fixed maximum size so that they can be placed on removable media.

The program has integration, and can create self-extracting executable archives for redistribution without licensing fees.

== Reception ==
CNET rated it 4/5 stars and wrote, "Easy program operation sets this freeware file compression tool apart from the crowded genre."

== See also ==
- Comparison of file archivers
- Comparison of archive formats
- List of archive formats
- ZIP (file format)
