= Norton Commander =

Discontinued orthodox file manager software

- Norton Commander v.5.51 for DOS. Note the long file names present when running on Windows.
- Original author: John Socha
- Release: 1986; 40 years ago
- Final release: 5.51 / 1 July 1998; 28 years ago
- Written in: C, assembly
- Operating system: MS-DOS
- Type: File manager
- License: Commercial proprietary software

Norton Commander (NC) is a discontinued prototypical orthodox file manager (OFM), written by John Socha and released by Peter Norton Computing (later acquired in 1990 by the Symantec corporation). NC provides a text-based user interface for managing files on top of MS-DOS. It was officially produced between 1986 and 1998. The last MS-DOS version of Norton Commander, 5.51, was released on July 1, 1998.

A related product, Norton Desktop, a graphical shell for MS-DOS and Windows, succeeded Norton Commander. It came in two variants, Norton Desktop for DOS and Norton Desktop for Windows.

== Background ==
Commander Norton mascot including his trademark cap and white gloves, used in NC 5.51 computer icons

I started work on what became known as the Norton Commander in the fall of 1984 while I was still a graduate student in Applied Physics at Cornell University. The first versions were entirely in assembly language, but that was too time-consuming, so I soon switched to a blend of C and assembly language at a time when most "real programmers" wouldn't touch C.

— John Socha described his work on NC

John Socha started work on Norton Commander in 1984; at the time, he called it "Visual DOS" or "VDOS".

Norton Commander was easy to use because it had a constant view of two file manipulation objects at once. After starting the program the user sees two panels with file lists. Each panel can be easily configured to show information about the other panel, a directory tree, or a number of other options. At the bottom of the screen, Norton Commander displays a list of commands that are extended on demand by the CTRL and ALT keys. Thus, without heavy use of the mouse (although mouse functionality was integrated around version 3.0), the user is able to perform many file manipulation actions quickly and efficiently. Additionally, it also includes a built-in text file viewer (invoked with F3 key) and text file editor (invoked with F4 key).

Norton Commander was very popular during the DOS era and it has been extensively cloned. For example, the IntelliJ IDE used to include a "Commander" plugin that performed file manipulation using the same shortcut keys as Norton Commander but the plugin is now obsolete.

=== Long filenames ===
Windows 95 included a new graphical shell called Windows Explorer and supported long filenames (LFN). Symantec released Norton Commander 5.51 to support long filenames using the standard Windows APIs. In order to preserve LFNs while working in real mode, Norton Commander 5.51 required the use of a terminate-and-stay-resident (TSR) utility. Norton Commander did not have native support for LFNs in real mode and would truncate them.

=== End of life ===
According to former Peter Norton Group developer Mark Lawler, after Symantec had acquired Peter Norton Computing, Symantec had speculated Microsoft Windows would be a success, so the key PNC resources had been diverted, while new programmers for the Windows platform were hired. Enrique Salem (who eventually became Symantec's CEO) led the development of a Windows shell replacement for Windows File Manager and Program Manager released as Norton Desktop for Windows.

== Norton Commander for Windows ==
Norton Commander for Windows was a Windows 95 variant of the classical DOS file manager.

=== 1.0 ===
Version 1.0 was first released in 1996. It supported both Windows 95 and Windows NT.

This version fully integrated with Windows features such as the Recycle Bin and Quick View. Quick View feature was supported via the included basic Quick View Plus.

Version 1.02 added Windows 98 support.

=== 2.0 ===
Norton Commander v.2.01 for Windows

Version 2.0 was released in 2000. It supports Windows 2000 and functions under Windows XP, Windows Vista, and Windows 7. Installer included Network Utilities, Norton Commander Scheduler, and the Norton Commander.

Network Utilities allows for viewing devices and systems on network, connecting to remote systems, mapping network drives, network monitoring, and more.

Norton Commander is little changed from previous versions, and includes file compression/de-compression of various formats, network utilities access, disk cleanup, files and folder compare, FTP connection management, and more.

The last Windows version of Norton Commander was 2.01.

== Norton Commander for OS/2 ==
Version 1.0 was released in December 1992. It supports OS/2 2.0 with HPFS or FAT file system.

It does not include the command prompt found in other versions of Norton Commander.

In June 1993, Symantec lowered the price of Norton Commander for OS/2 to $49, and soon ceased sales.

== Reception ==
InfoWorld in January 1988 noted that Norton Commander version 1.0 had not changed since its introduction but was still "way ahead of the pack". The magazine cited its speed, small memory use, ability to compare two directories at once, and intuitive user interface without a directory tree. BYTE in January 1989 listed Norton Commander 2.0 for DOS as among the "Distinction" winners of the BYTE Awards, stating that "navigating through a crowded hard disk is a breeze".

== Norton Commander-inspired software ==
There are many programs that follow the style of Norton Commander as created by John Socha. Examples are:

Stereo Shell v.S4.10 for DOS

- ACE Archiver for DOS in the first versions had a NC-inspired interactive interface
- Altap Salamander for Windows
- BeFAR for BeOS
- Commander One for macOS
- Demos Commander for Unix and Linux
- Directory Opus for Amiga (1990) and Windows (2001)
- DOS Command Center (DCC) DOS and Win95 versions
- DOS Navigator for DOS
- Double Commander for Windows and Linux
- FAR Manager for Windows, OSX and Linux
- fman for Windows, Mac and Linux
- Ghost Commander for Android systems
- GNOME Commander for Unix-like systems
- HiFile for Windows, Mac and Linux
- Krusader for Unix-like systems
- Midnight Commander for Unix-like systems (including macOS) and Windows
- muCommander for Java platform
- Music on Console for Unix-like systems; actually a music player
- Necromancer's DOS Navigator (NDN) for DOS, Windows, OS/2, Linux, Haiku, KolibriOS, MenuetOS SigmaOS and FreeBSD.
- PowerDesk by Avanquest, of which an evaluation version of Version 4 is included in Microsoft's Windows NT 4.0 Resource Kits
- Stereo Shell for DOS
- The DOS Controller by Søren Kragh
- Total Commander for Windows
- Volkov Commander for DOS
- WinNC for Windows 10
- RAR archive manager used to have Norton Commander-like interface, the last version with that interactive file manager interface look-alike was DOS version 2.50
- Xfolders for OS X

== References in popular culture ==
- Norton Commander is a song released by the Montreal indie group, Men I Trust. While the song contains no literal references to the Norton Commander file manager, it is speculated that the song's subject matter of comfort and familiarity relate to the familiarity and reliability of the software.

== See also ==
- Comparison of file managers
