= PowerArchiver =

File archiver for Microsoft Windows

- PowerArchiver 2016 running on Windows
- Developer: ConeXware Inc.

Stable release(s)
- Windows: 22.10.02 / 3 December 2025
- macOS: 2.00.01 / 18 November 2021
- Operating system: Windows, macOS
- Type: File archiver
- License: Trialware
- Website: powerarchiver.com

PowerArchiver is a proprietary file archiver for Microsoft Windows and MacOS, developed by ConeXware Inc. It supports creating and reading ZIP, 7z, and Tar archive formats, as well as various disk image formats. Additionally, it can read (but not create) RAR and ACE files. The evaluation version of the program remains functional for 40 days. Personal licenses are currently permitted free lifetime updates to all future versions of the software, while the business license is valid through two major versions.

PowerArchiver's first public release was made in March 1999. It was advertised as a free archiving solution and was written in Borland Delphi. It turned into shareware in June 2001 with version 7. Prior to being PowerArchiver, the software was known as EasyZip. A command-line version and a Microsoft Outlook plugin is also provided. PowerArchiver's user interface has been translated into 15 languages.

The latest release of PowerArchiver fully supports Windows 7 and provides the user an option to use the ribbon GUI, as featured in Microsoft Office 2007 and Windows 7. Users can revert to the old-style toolbar if they wish.

In 2011, Softpedia gave it five stars, praising its wide support for various compressed file types, FTP and backup feature by pointing out its lack of complete support of VHD files.

In 2020, SoftFamous gave five stars to the file archiver software.

== See also ==
- Data compression
- Comparison of file archivers
