= BetterZip =

- BetterZip 2.1.2 in Mac OS X 10.7.2
- Developer(s): Robert Rezabek
- Initial release: May 4, 2006; 18 years ago
- Stable release: 5.3.4 / 11 April 2023
- Operating system: macOS 10.10 and later
- Available in: Multiple languages
- Type: File archiver
- License: Trialware
- Website: macitbetter.com

BetterZip is a trialware file archiver developed by Robert Rezabek, and first released in May 2006.It is developed solely for the macOS platform. Unlike the built-in Archive Utility from Apple it includes the ability to extract and compress in many archive formats, as well as the ability to view an archive and selectively extract files without automatically extracting the entire contents.

== Features ==
BetterZip supports extraction of the following file types:

- ZIP, SIT, TAR, GZip, BZip2, RAR, 7-Zip, CPIO, ARJ, LZH/LHA, JAR, WAR, CAB, ISO, CHM, RPM, DEB, NSIS, BIN, HQX, DD

The following file types are supported for archive creation:

- ZIP, Uncompressed TAR, TAR with Gzip compression, TAR with BZip2 compression, 7Z, XAR

BetterZip does not include RAR compression without separately downloading the command line RAR utility from Rarlab. BetterZip will then integrate RAR compression into its GUI like other formats.

== See also ==
- Comparison of file archivers
- Comparison of archive formats
- List of archive formats
