= KGB Archiver =

File archiver and data compression utility

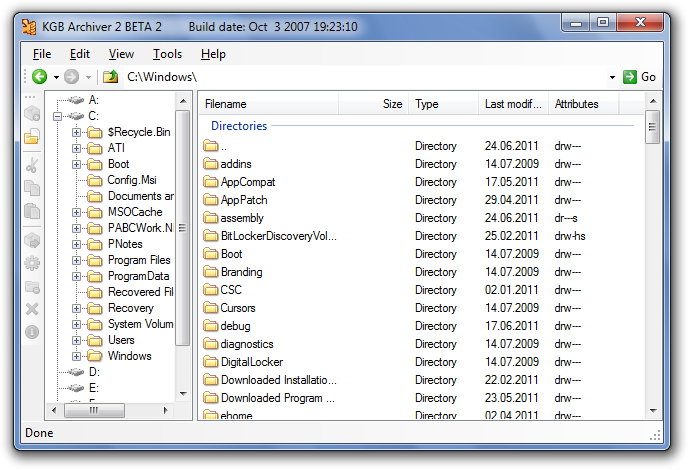
- Screenshot of KGB Archiver 2.0 beta 2
- Developer: Tomasz Pawlak
- Initial release: April 2006
- Written in: Visual C++
- Operating system: Windows, Unix-like
- Available in: English, Arabic, Czech, German, Greek, Japanese, Polish, Portuguese, Serbian, Spanish, and Ukrainian
- Type: File archiver
- License: GPL-2.0-only
- Repository: KGB Archiver Repository

KGB Archiver is a discontinued file archiver and data compression utility that employs the PAQ6 compression algorithm. Written in Visual C++ by Tomasz Pawlak, KGB Archiver is designed to achieve a very high compression ratio. It has ten levels of compression, from very weak to maximum. However, at higher compression levels, the time required to compress a file increases significantly. As a consequence, the program uses memory and CPU intensively.

KGB Archiver is free and open-source, released under the terms of the GNU General Public License. Version 2 beta 2 is available for Microsoft Windows and a command-line version of KGB Archiver 1.0 is available for Unix-like operating systems.

== Features ==
- Native .kgb files and .zip files
- AES-256 encryption
- Creating self-extracting archives
- Unicode support in both the user interface and file system interactions
- Shell extension for Windows

== System requirements ==
The minimum requirements for running KGB Archiver are:

- 1.5 GHz processor
- 256 MB RAM

== See also ==
- Comparison of file archivers
- RAR (file format)
- ZPAQ
