= Total Commander =

Orthodox file manager

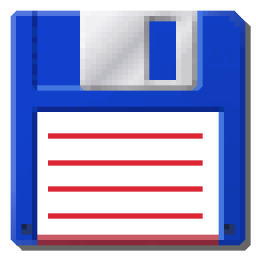

- Total Commander 9.0a screenshot
- Developer: Christian Ghisler
- Release: September 25, 1993; 33 years ago

Stable release(s)
- Android: 3.62 / 16 February 2026
- Windows: 11.58 / 1 July 2026

Preview release(s)
- Android: 3.62 beta 2 / 6 February 2026
- Windows: 11.58 rc 5 / 24 June 2026
- Written in: Object Pascal
- Operating system: Windows, Android, Windows Phone
- Size: Windows: 6.0 – 7.1 MiB; Android: 4.5 MiB; Windows Phone: 2.7 MiB
- Type: File manager
- License: Shareware on Windows; Freeware on Android and Windows Phone
- Website: www.ghisler.com

Total Commander is an orthodox file manager, i.e. it features two file list panels (selectable via tab key) and a command line. It supports multiple tabs for each panel.

Total Commander is developed by Christian Ghisler and distributed as shareware or freeware, depending on the platform.

Total Commander, then called Windows Commander, was originally developed for Windows, using the programming environment Delphi. Current Windows versions are developed with Delphi (for 32-bit versions) and Lazarus (for 64-bit versions).

== Features ==
- Runs on Windows 95 and later, Android, Windows Phone, Windows Mobile, and Windows CE For the most part, it is compatible with Linux using Wine.
- Supported archive file format: 7z, ace, arj, cab, gz, lzh, rar, tar, uc2, and zip.
- File compare
- File encode/decode: mime, uue, xxe
- File filter
- File rename (including multi-file rename with wildcard and regex support)
- File search (with full text search), duplicate file search
- File split/combine
- file transfer protocol (FTP) client
- File tree operations: copy, delete, move, rename
- File viewer: any size in hex, bin, text with ASCII (DOS) or ANSI (Windows) character set
- Quick view panel with image and video display
- Synchronize folders
- Thumbnails view
- Dark mode

Total Commander supports extensibility via plugins, and it can bind external programs for viewing or editing files. Many plugins are freely available, e.g. different packer formats or file viewer for special file formats. The Android version has plugins for direct access to external servers, which it presents as if they were simply local SD cards, making file copying from phone<>server trivial - currently Google Drive, Microsoft OneDrive, TotalDrip, LAN, SFTP and WebDAV are supported. It also has an integrated media player that works both foreground and background - video and audio. Supporting most, if not all, file formats. Many functions not available by default are supported and can be assigned to icons. For example it supports device->device file transfer over WI-FI using an associated app.

== History ==
From 1993 until 2002, Total Commander was called Windows Commander. The name was changed in 2002 after Microsoft pointed out that the word "Windows" was their trademark.

== See also ==
- Comparison of file managers
- Far Manager
- USB On-The-Go
