= Quantum compression =

Quantum compression may refer to:

- Data compression as it relates to quantum computing
- Quantum, one of several compression algorithms used by CAB
