= Commander One =

File manager for macOS

- Developers: Electronic Team, Inc.
- Written in: Swift
- Operating system: OS X v.10.9.x - 11.x
- Size: 58.68 MB
- Available in: English, French, German, Dutch, Czech, Chinese, Hungarian, Italian, Japanese, Korean, Polish, Portuguese, Spanish, Ukrainian
- Type: File manager, FTP client, Archiver
- License: Proprietary
- Website: www.electronic.us/products/commander-one/

Commander One is a dual-pane file manager designed for macOS. Developed by Electronic Team, Inc., the software is created entirely in Swift and aims to provide users with a tool to navigate, manage, and manipulate files and folders on their Mac computers. The application offers a wide range of features for both casual and professional users.

Commander One is officially approved by Christian Ghisler, the developer of Total Commander, as an alternative to his software for the macOS platform It supports multiple languages, including English, Czech, Simplified Chinese, Dutch, French, German, Hungarian, Italian, Japanese, Korean, Polish, Portuguese, Spanish, and Russian.

== Features ==
The software application comes with a variety of features bundled together in the free version as well as the "PRO" package. These are some of the features:

- Dual-Pane Interface: adopts a dual-pane interface for file and directory browsing
- Multi-Tab Browsing: supports simultaneously navigating through different locations using multiple tabs
- Built-in Viewer: includes a built-in viewer for various file types without the need for additional software
- File Operations: operations such as copy, move, rename, delete, compress, and extract are supported
- Quick and Advanced File Search: offers a simple search functionality, and an advanced search feature to locate files or folders based on user-defined criteria (regex).
- Hotkeys Setup: hotkeys can be configured to access frequently used functions
- Work with Archives: natively supports ZIP file compression and extraction, as well as expanded support for various file compression formats, including RAR (extract only), TBZ, TGZ, and 7z
- Display of Hidden Files: provides a special toggle switch that allows displaying hidden files, giving access to files that are not visible in the default macOS file manager.
- Renaming Files and Folders during Movement: allows renaming files or folders while moving them to a different location.
- Three viewing modes: offers three viewing modes for file browsing: "Full", for detailed file information; "Brief", for a concise overview; and "Thumbs", for visual browsing through media files
- Personalized Interface Customization: fonts, colors, and themes can be changed for a customized UI, according to user preferences and work environment
- Root Access: allows root access for performing administrative actions and managing system files that require elevated permissions
- Built-in FTP Client: supports file transfers via FTP, FTPS (FTP over SSL/TLS), and SFTP
- MTP, Android, and iOS Devices Mounting: allows mounting of MTP (Media Transfer Protocol), Android, and iOS devices (not available in the App Store version of the software) and managing files stored on these devices.
- Integration with Cloud Storage: allows directly mounting and managing cloud storage services, such as Google Drive, Dropbox, OneDrive, and Amazon S3
- Terminal Emulator: a built-in terminal emulator is included for executing command-line operations
- Encryption on Online Connections: supports encryption of data transfers and interactions with remote servers
- Process Viewer: allows monitoring of running processes and system resource usage

== Operating system support ==
Commander One is specifically designed for macOS systems and is compatible with macOS 10.12 and later versions. The software runs natively on Mac computers with Apple silicon: M1 and M2 series.

== Reception ==
In 2015, MacWorld rated Commander One as 3.5 out of 5 stars, concluding that it adds some useful functions to the standard Finder, but it was let down by its user interface and bugs in some of its functions, in particular with the built-in FTP manager. The article was later updated with a notice that the problem with the FTP manager had been solved by a subsequent update (version 1.2)

A TechRepublic review mentions that Commander One offers convenient efficiencies and simplifies the workflow with its dual-pane interface and a number of features, like an FTP client, compression support, Terminal Emulator, and Dropbox integration. In general, the author finds it a handy application to use.

Tom Nelson in his review of Commander One on About.com highlights the app's features, including File Viewer, FTP/SFTP/FTPS client, Dropbox integration, view modes, etc., and draws the conclusion that "Commander One provides additional file management capabilities at a very reasonable price (free) and offers more advanced functions as add-ons that you can purchase or not, depending on your needs."

An Apple Tech Talk article on Commander One 2.1 highlights the software’s benefits, including a "clean" interface, the ability to view hidden files, and create hotkeys. It also mentions that the PRO Pack option extends its functionality with features like FTP support, cloud integration, and theme customization. While acknowledging a learning curve, the article sees Commander One as "a valuable addition to any Mac user" seeking enhanced file management capabilities.

In an article on pcweenies.com, the author provides an in-depth evaluation of Commander One, outlining the features and capabilities of the software, comparing it to macOS Finder and highlighting its strengths as a file management tool. The review touches on various aspects, including customization options, keyboard shortcuts, process monitoring, and cloud storage and mobile device integration. The author praises the software's functionality and accessibility while also discussing some nuances and differences in behavior compared to macOS Finder. The review offers insights into the user experience, particularly for power users who seek advanced file management solutions.

Commander One is a "very capable" file manager designed specifically for Mac systems, as reviewed in an article on MacSources. The reviewer highlights its "intuitive" design and "aesthetically pleasing" user interface, earning a rating of 92% for its "excellent" performance.

In a review by Hammad Baig for twitgoo.com, the author evaluates the software’s capabilities as a file management solution for Mac users. The reviewer highlights the features Commander One's offers that are not supported by the default Mac file manager, such as dual-pane mode, hidden file viewing, hotkey support, file previews, root access, built-in FTP client, and compatibility with various cloud services. He also mentions the software's ease of use, encryption capabilities, Android file transfer feature, and "dark mode".

A TechWhoop Team review emphasizes the software's dual-pane design for multitasking, features like RegEx search, mobile device management, menu functions, and cloud storage support. The review also mentions the availability of both free and paid versions, with the Pro version offering additional benefits such as cloud data storage integration and FTP client capabilities. The review concludes by affirming Commander One's "smooth" and "user-friendly" experience.

Digital Connect Mag describes the software as a potential solution for simplifying file management tasks and emphasizes its compatibility with various cloud services and remote servers. The article highlights the features of Commander One in detail, including its "easy file selection and management" capabilities, brief mode, "smooth" file selection, hotkey customization, etc.

== See also ==
- File managers
- Norton Commander
