= LZX =

Compression algorithm

LZX is an LZ77 family compression algorithm, a slightly improved version of DEFLATE. It is also the name of a file archiver with the same name. Both were invented by Jonathan Forbes and Tomi Poutanen in the 1990s.

== Instances of use of the LZX algorithm ==
=== Amiga LZX ===
LZX was publicly released as an Amiga file archiver in 1995, while the authors were studying at the University of Waterloo in Canada. The software was shareware, which was common for compression software at the time. The registered version contained fixes and improvements that were not available in the evaluation version. In 1997, the authors gave away a free keyfile, which allowed anyone to use the registered version, as they had stopped work on the archiver and stopped accepting registrations.

=== Microsoft Cabinet files ===
In 1996, Forbes went to work for Microsoft, and Microsoft's cabinet archiver was enhanced to include the LZX compression method. Improvements included a variable search window size; Amiga LZX was fixed to 64 KB, and Microsoft LZX could range on powers of two between 32 and 2048 kilobytes (32,768 to 2,097,152 bytes). A special preprocessor was added to detect Intel 80x86 "CALL" instructions, converting their operands from relative addressing to absolute addressing, thus calls to the same location resulted in repeated strings that the compressor could match, improving compression of 80x86 binary code. (This technique is later generalized as Branch-Call-Jump [BCJ] filtering.)

=== Microsoft Compressed HTML Help (CHM) files ===
When Microsoft introduced Microsoft Compressed HTML Help, the replacement for their classic Help file format, they chose to compress all of the HTML data with the LZX algorithm. However, in order to improve random access speed, the compressor was altered to reset itself after every 64 kilobyte (65,536 bytes) interval and re-align to a 16-bit boundary after every 32 kilobyte interval. Thus, the HTMLHelp software could immediately seek the nearest 64 kilobyte interval and start decoding from there, rather than decoding from the beginning of the compressed datastream at all times.

=== Microsoft Reader (LIT) files ===
Microsoft LIT files for Microsoft Reader are simply an extension of the CHM file format, and thus also use LZX compression.

=== Windows Imaging Format (WIM) files ===
Windows Imaging Format, the installation/drive image file format of Windows Vista and Windows 7, uses LZX as one of the compression methods.

=== CompactOS NTFS file compression ===
In Windows 10, LZX compression from Windows Imaging Format is used for the new CompactOS NTFS file compression.

=== Xbox Live Avatars ===
Microsoft uses LZX compression on Xbox Live Avatars to reduce their disk and bandwidth requirements.

== Decompressing LZX files ==
The unlzx program and XAD can unpack Amiga LZX archives. The cabextract program can unpack Microsoft cabinet files using the LZX method. There are a multitude of cross-platform tools for decompiling or viewing CHM files, as stated in the CHM article. LIT files can be unpacked using the Convert LIT software.

== See also ==
- List of archive formats
- Comparison of file archivers
