= The Unarchiver =

File decompression utility

- Original author: Dag Ågren
- Developers: Circlesoft, MacPaw
- Release: September 2006; 20 years ago
- Stable release: 4.3.8 / 16 May 2024
- Operating system: macOS, Linux using GNUstep libraries, and command line only on Microsoft Windows, Linux, macOS
- Available in: 18 languages
- List of languages English, Arabic, Bulgarian, Czech, Dutch, French, German, Hungarian, Italian, Japanese, Latvian, Norwegian Bokmål, Polish, Portuguese, Russian, Simplified Chinese, Spanish, Turkish
- Type: File Extractor / Decompressor
- License: Proprietary since acquisition Formerly LGPLv2.1-or-later
- Website: theunarchiver.com
- Repository: heptapod.host/DagAgren/TheUnarchiver

The Unarchiver is a free data decompression utility, which supports more formats than Archive Utility (formerly known as BOMArchiveHelper), the built-in archive unpacker program in macOS. It can also handle filenames in various character encodings, created using operating system versions that use those character encodings. The Unarchiver does not compress files.

A key feature of The Unarchiver is its ability to handle many old or obscure Mac OS Classic and Amiga archive formats, including StuffIt, Compact Pro, AmigaOS disk images, and LZH/LZX archives. The source code credits libxad, an Amiga file format library. Utility author Dag Ågren reverse engineered the StuffIt and StuffIt X formats. His work resulted in one of the most complete open source implementations of these proprietary formats.

== History ==
=== Open source era ===
The Unarchiver, version 1.1 was publicly introduced to the world in September 2006 by Finland-based MacOS software developer Dag Ågren to run on Mac OS X 10.4 Tiger. Ågren's last public release was version 3.11.1 that was released in May 2016 for Mac OS X 10.3.9 Panther and higher

The Unarchiver was free software licensed under the LGPL, up to version 3.11.1 (released 2016). This version, and the versions prior to the buyout, are still available for download from Dag Ågren's original website. The Unarchiver version 3.11.1 provided a free-software implementation of extraction of RAR versions up to RAR5.

=== Closed source era ===
Ukraine-based MacPaw purchased The Unarchiver and related software technology from Dag Ågren in July 2017 for an undisclosed sum. MacPaw released version 4.0.0 in June 2018 for Mac OS X 10.7 Lion and higher. Version 4.1.0 was released in February 2019. Version 4.3.5 was released in May 2022 for Mac OS X 10.9 Mavericks.

The most recent version, 4.3.9, was released in March 2025 for MacOS 10.13 High Sierra or later.

== Related software ==
=== unar and lsar command line utilities ===
The corresponding command line utilities unar and lsar are free software licensed under the LGPL run on Microsoft Windows, Linux, and macOS.

Ågren released version 1.0 of the command line utilities in March 2012. Ågren's last public release was version 1.10.1, which was released in May 2016. MacPaw performed minor fixes and bumped the version up to 1.10.7 by April 2020.

=== The Archive Browser ===
In March 2012, Ågren released version 1.0 of The Archive Browser, a finder-like program that can browse inside almost any archive which can be opened by The Unarchiver, on the Mac App Store as a commercial program that required Mac OS X 10.6 Snow Leopard or later. Ågren's last public release was version 1.11.1 that was released in May 2016 for OS X 10.7 Lion and higher Although, MacPaw acquired The Archive Browser in 2017, MacPaw did not further develop this technology and eventually dropped its distribution by mid-2020.

=== Archives ===
Archives is an iOS version of The Unarchiver. Version 1.0 was released in October 2012 by Dag Ågren as a commercial product. Ågren's last public release was version 2.1 that was released in May 2016. MacPaw performed minor fixes and released version 2.1.1 via the Mac App Store in October 2018. Version 2.1.1 is the most recent edition.
