= ZipGenius =

Freeware file archiver

- ZipGenius on startup
- Developer: Matteo Riso
- Release: November 1997; 28 years ago
- Stable release: 6.3.2.3116 / 1 February 2017; 9 years ago
- Operating system: Windows XP or later
- Size: 12.29 MB
- Available in: Italian, English, other
- Type: File archiver
- License: Freeware
- Website: zipgenius.it

ZipGenius is a freeware file archiver developed by The ZipGenius Team for Microsoft Windows. It is capable of handling nearly two dozen file formats, including all the most common formats, as well as password-protect archives and work directly with CD-R/RW drives. It is presented in two editions: standard and suite. While the suite edition includes optional modules of the ZipGenius project (oriented to experts and power-users), the standard setup package simply includes the main ZipGenius application.

ZipGenius was first released as Mr. Zip 98 to a strict group of users, and renamed ZipGenius in March 1998. In April 1999, its first public release was made. ZipGenius's latest release is version 6.3.2.3112 (August 8, 2014; 12 years ago), containing many fixes, the majority of which are bug fixes not visible at first glance.

== Features ==
ZipGenius features include: support for TWAIN devices (scanners and digital cameras), file extraction to CD/DVD burner (only under Windows XP), an FTP client (FTPGenius), and ZGAlbum. ZGAlbum allows users to create slideshows with pictures, which can be loaded from a folder or imported through a TWAIN device.

ZipGenius also fully integrates with Windows Explorer shell. User interface and functions have been placed in multiple locations. Program functions can be accessed either from a menu of buttons on the main toolbar, or from a drop-down menu. They can be customized to suit user preferences.

ZipGenius 6 is capable of opening a variety of formats commonly used with Linux, such as RPM, TAR, TAR.GZ, TGZ, GZ and 7Z.

As regards data security, the archive history file is encrypted, the most recently used files list can be enabled (always or per-session) or disabled, and CryptoZip 2.1 gives encryption algorithms to lock user archives. Users can create self-locking/self-erasing archives and can choose to encrypt files with one of four algorithms (CZIP, Blowfish, Twofish, Rijndael AES). Also, CZIP files no longer depends on ZipGenius because users can create executable CZIP (.EXE) files which will allow the user to send encrypted archives to people who do not use ZipGenius.

ZipGenius is hosted at zipgenius.it, but in 2008 the WinInizio Software team put zipgenius.com online to offer an international website for users not speaking Italian. On July 1, 2009, website ZipGenius.it has been totally redesigned upon the MODx web application. On July 6, 2009, ZipGenius 6.1.0.1010 was released to the public.

Current release is 6.3.2.3116 since February 1, 2017. Release 6.3.2.3117 is set to be published during summer 2020 and it will be the last release in the 6.x series because the Project ZipGenius X development has started and the first application, CZIP X, has been released. Later in 2020, the main ZipGenius X app will be released.

== File formats ==
ZipGenius is able to handle the open source UPX executable compressor, which is used to compress ZipGenius main executable. If UPX.exe is in ZipGenius program folder, users will get an extra compression level while creating new ZIP archives: Brutal+UPX. Many executable files (EXE, DLL, OCX) are distributed as they are after code compilation, so they may have a larger size than necessary.

ZipGenius supports the 7-Zip compression format, conceived by Igor Pavlov, which can compress files more than standard ZIP or RAR compression formats.

ZipGenius supports OpenOffice.org/StarOffice documents. OpenOffice.org applications produce their own files in a special format: they are .ZIP archives with a custom file extension containing some XML files, which OpenOffice.org programs merge to rebuild the original documents. ZipGenius complies with this feature, and allows users to manage those files as if they were common ZIP files. In addition, users can optimize them: OpenOffice.org does not use the maximum compression level available for .ZIP format, but ZipGenius does. When users optimize an OpenOffice.org document with ZipGenius, the gain is from 5 to 10 KB of size reduction (depending by the content of the OpenOffice.org file) because ZipGenius will recompress the document with the "Brutal" compression level.

== See also ==
- List of file archivers
- Comparison of file archivers
