= Dar (disk archiver) =

Data compression archiver and format

dar
- Release: 2 February 2002; 24 years ago
- Stable release: 2.8.6 / 19 August 2026
- Written in: C++
- Operating system: Linux; Windows; Solaris; FreeBSD; NetBSD; macOS
- Type: Data compression
- License: GPL-2.0-or-later
- Website: dar.linux.free.fr
- Repository: DAR Repository, GitHub DAR Repository

dar (disk archive) is a computer program, a command-line archiving and backup tool intended as a replacement or alternative to tar in Unix-like operating systems.

== Features ==
The feature set of Dar is vast: it encompass the care taken to involve many if not all attributes and properties of files under backup, to the way this data is wrapped with selective compression, encryption, slicing associated to a very rich set of filtering mechanism (based on filename, pathname, Extended Attribute presence, filesystem location, and so forth) to select the data under the operation, where the operation is one of the following: backup, restoration, content listing, archive testing, backup isolation (copying the table of content into a separated file for redundancy and easier differential backup), merging and repairing. Here follows a more detailed list of features:

- Support for slices, archives split over multiple files of a particular size
- Option of deleting files from the system which are removed in the archive
- Full backup
- Differential backup
- Incremental backup,
- Decremental backup (schema where the most recent is a full backup and the older are difference from a more recent one)
- Takes care of any type of inode (directory, plain files, symlinks, special devices, named pipes, sockets, doors, ...)
- Takes care of hard-linked inodes (hard-linked plain files, char devices, block devices, hard-linked symlinks)
- Takes care of sparse files
- Takes care of Linux file Extended Attributes,
- Takes care of Linux file ACL
- Takes care of Mac OS X file forks
- Takes care of some filesystem specific attributes like Birthdate of HFS+ filesystem and immutable, data-journaling, secure-deletion, no-tail-merging, undeletable, noatime attributes of ext2/3/4 filesystem.
- Per-file compression with gzip, bzip2, lzo, xz, lzma, zstd or lz4 (as opposed to compressing the whole archive). The user can choose not to compress already compressed files based on their filename suffix (a default rich list of such suffix is provided with dar)
- Fast-extracting of files from anywhere in the archive
- Fast listing of archive contents through saving the catalogue of files in the archive
- Optional Blowfish, Twofish, AES, Serpent, Camellia encryption, including a tunable Key Derivation Function (using argon2 by default) with salt and an encrypted elastic buffer at the beginning and the end of the data to reduce the risk of codebook attack
- Optional public key encryption and signature (OpenPGP)
- Live filesystem backup: detects when a file has been modified while it was read for backup and can retry saving it up to a given maximum number of retries
- Hash file (MD5, SHA1, SHA-512 or whirlpool) generated on-fly for each slice, the resulting file is compatible with md5sum -c, sha1sum -c, sha512sum -c or whirlpool-hash -c, to be able to quickly check each slice's integrity
- Filesystem independent: it may be used to restore a system to a partition of a different size and/or to a partition with a different filesystem
- Backup can be stored locally but also remotely and efficiently via FTP or SFTP without local storage requirement and within a backup only the needed portions of data are requested over the network (decompression and deciphering is done after transfer when the data comes to dar).

== Frontends ==
There are GUI frontends for dar called:

- Kdar for Linux, specifically KDE,
- DarGUI for Linux and Windows,
- gdar for Linux.
- Webdar, web-based GUI with all dar features (including FTP and SFTP remote backups)

A text-mode browser/extractor: plugin for dar files in mc (Midnight Commander).

A scheduler / command-line frontend known as SaraB allows the Towers of Hanoi, Grandfather-Father-Son, or any custom backup rotation strategy, and modifications are available for PAR file support. Extended versions known as bzSaraB and baras are also available.

== See also ==
- FSArchiver
- List of file archivers
- List of archive formats
- Comparison of archive formats
