= B1 Free Archiver =

Multi-platform file archiver and file manager

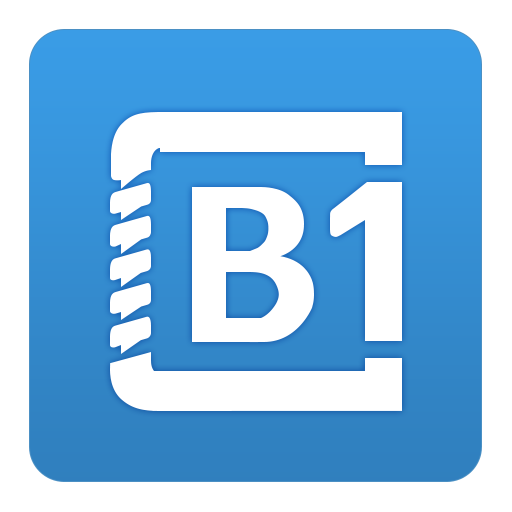
- Developer: Adam Buyer
- Release: 11 August 2011
- Operating system: Microsoft Windows, Linux, macOS, Android
- Platform: 32-bit, 64-bit
- Available in: More than 30 languages
- Type: File archiver
- License: Proprietary
- Website: www.b1.org

B1 Free Archiver is a proprietary freeware multi-platform file archiver and file manager. B1 Archiver is available for Microsoft Windows, Linux, macOS, and Android. It has full support (compression, unpacking and encryption) for ZIP and its native B1 format. The program decompresses more than 20 popular archive formats. It creates split and encrypted archives.

B1 Free Archiver is translated into more than 30 languages. Translations are made by volunteers through the Crowdin localization management platform. The program can be used through graphical user interface or command line interface. B1 Free Archiver is written in C++/Qt and is released under a proprietary license.

== Features ==
B1 Free Archiver supports opening most popular archive formats (such as B1, ZIP, RAR, 7z, GZIP, TAR.GZ, TAR.BZ2 and ISO) but can create only .b1 and .zip archives. The utility can also create split archives which consist of several parts each of specified size and password-protected archives, encrypted with 256 bit AES algorithm. Desktop application supports editing of the archive - adding new files, deleting files from the archive, editing files directly in the archive. B1 Free Archiver has full drag-and-drop support, keyboard shortcuts and hotkeys navigation. The program works on Windows (XP and higher), Linux (Ubuntu/Debian, Fedora), macOS (10.6 and higher) and Android. There is also Online B1 Free Archiver decompression tool.

Main disadvantages are that files inside the B1 archives doesn't retain timestamps.
