= WinZip =

File compression software

- WinZip 26 running in Windows 10 with a ribbon
- Original author: WinZip International LLC
- Developers: Alludo, formerly Corel Corporation
- Release: April 3, 1991; 35 years ago

Stable release(s)
- Windows: 30.0.16477 / 27 August 2025; 13 months ago
- macOS: 12.0.7282 / 10 November 2024; 23 months ago
- iOS: 7.14 / 9 October 2024; 2 years ago
- Android: 7.1.1 / 11 January 2024; 2 years ago
- Operating system: Microsoft Windows, macOS, iOS and Android
- Size: 57.13 MB
- Available in: 12 languages
- List of languages English, Spanish, French, German, Japanese, Portuguese, Italian, Korean, Chinese, Russian, Dutch, Czech
- Type: File archiver
- License: Trialware
- Website: www.winzip.com

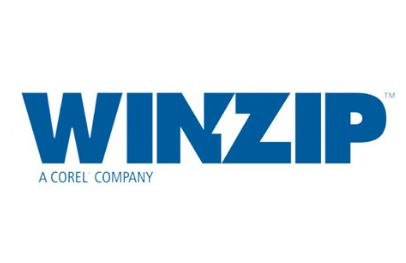
WinZip Computing Inc. logo

WinZip is a trialware file archiver and compressor for Microsoft Windows, macOS, iOS and Android. It is developed by WinZip Computing (formerly Nico Mak Computing), which is owned by Alludo. The program can create archives in Zip file format, unpack some other archive file formats and it also has various tools for system integration.

== History ==
WinZip 1.0 was released in April 1991 as a graphical user interface (GUI) front-end for PKZIP. The ZIP file archive format (ZIP) was originally invented for MS-DOS in 1989 by Phil Katz.

WinZip 5.0 implemented built-in PKZIP routines and code from Info-Zip and so no longer needed the PKZIP executable.

Former WinZip icon

From version 6.0 until version 9.0, registered users could download the newest versions of the software, enter their original registration information or install over the top of their existing registered version, and thereby obtain a free upgrade. This upgrade scheme was discontinued as of version 10.0.

On May 2, 2006, WinZip Computing was acquired by Corel Corporation using the proceeds from its initial public offering.

In 2010, WinZip went multi-platform with the release of WinZip 1.0 for Mac OS X (November 16, 2010). This initial release was compatible with Intel Macs and could be run on v10.5 'Leopard.' The iOS version of WinZip was first released on February 17, 2012, WinZip Android was first released on June 19, 2012.

== Supported ZIP archive features ==
- 128- and 256-bit key AES encryption in addition to the less secure PKZIP 2.0 encryption method used in earlier versions. The AES implementation, using Brian Gladman's code, was FIPS-197 certified, on March 27, 2003. However, Central Directory Encryption feature is not supported.

== Release history ==
WinZip 17 Pro on Windows

Chart: WinZip Windows release timeline

Table: History of WinZip Windows releases

Version	File size	Released	Support Expiration	Final Release Version
PMZip 1.0 /OS2	67 KB	January 14, 1991	Expired	
WinZip 1.0	56 KB	April 3, 1991	Expired	
WinZip 2.0	78 KB	July 30, 1991	Expired	
WinZip 3.1	101 KB	April 6, 1992	Expired	
WinZip 3.1b	108 KB	September 8, 1992	Expired	
WinZip 3.2	116 KB	October 3, 1992	Expired	
WinZip 4.0	139 KB	January 16, 1993	Expired	
WinZip 4.0a	151 KB	March 17, 1993	Expired	
WinZip 4.0b	151 KB	April 2, 1993	Expired	
WinZip 4.1	133 KB	June 26, 1993	Expired	
WinZip 4.1a	169 KB	August 12, 1993	Expired	
WinZip 5.0	189 KB	November 8, 1993	Expired	
WinZip 5.0a	194 KB	January 26, 1994	Expired	
WinZip 5.0b	194 KB	March 11, 1994	Expired	
WinZip 5.5a	0.3 MB	August 15, 1994	Expired	
WinZip 5.6	287 KB	January 24, 1995	Expired	
WinZip 6.0	313 KB	August 14, 1995	Expired	
WinZip 6.0a	0.4 MB	December 4, 1995	Expired	
WinZip 6.1	487 KB	October 1, 1996	Expired	
WinZip 6.2	563 KB	October 18, 1996	Expired	
WinZip 6.3	615 KB (16-bit); 0.7 MB (32-bit)	September 20, 1997	Expired	
WinZip 7.0	922 KB	October 5, 1998	Expired	
WinZip 8.0	1.20 MB	April 25, 2000	Expired	
WinZip 8.1	1.7 MB; 1.8 MB (SR-1)	December 10, 2001	Expired	
WinZip 9.0	3.9 MB	February 24, 2004	Expired	
WinZip 9.0 SR1	2.3 MB	December 2004	Expired	
WinZip 10.0	5.6 MB	November 1, 2005	Expired	Windows 98/ME
WinZip 11.0	7.3 MB	November 2006	Expired	
WinZip 11.1	8.9 MB	April 2007	Expired	
WinZip 11.2	13.0 MB	April 2008	Expired	
WinZip 12.0	13.9 MB	September 2008	Expired	
WinZip 12.1	13.0 MB	May 2009	Expired	
WinZip 14.0	13.7 MB	October 2009	Expired	
WinZip 14.5	13.8 MB	April 2010	Expired	Windows 2000
WinZip 15	18.6 MB	November 2010	Expired	
WinZip for Mac 1.0	8.6 MB	November 2010	Expired	
WinZip 15.5	16.1 MB	April 2011	Expired	
WinZip 16	21.1 MB (32-bit); 23.2 MB (64-bit)	October 2011	Expired	
WinZip 16.5	21.1 MB (32-bit); 23.2 MB (64-bit)	April 2012	Expired	
WinZip 17	21.1 MB (32-bit); 23.2 MB (64-bit)	October 2012	Expired	
WinZip 17.5	MB (32-bit); MB (64-bit)	May 2013	Expired	
WinZip 18	MB (32-bit); MB (64-bit)	October 2013	Expired	
WinZip 18.5	MB (32-bit); MB (64-bit)	May 2014	Expired	
WinZip 19	MB (32-bit); MB (64-bit)	October 2014	Expired	
WinZip 20	MB (32-bit); MB (64-bit)	October 2015	Expired	
WinZip 20.5	MB (32-bit); MB (64-bit)	May 2016	Expired	Windows XP (providing: IE8 is present + SP3 installed)
WinZip 21	MB (32-bit); MB (64-bit)	October 2016	Expired	
WinZip 21.5	MB (32-bit); MB (64-bit)	April 2017	Expired	
WinZip 22	MB (32-bit); MB (64-bit)	October 2017	Expired	
WinZip 23	MB (32-bit); MB (64-bit)	November 2018	Expired	
WinZip 24	MB (32-bit); MB (64-bit)	September 2019	Expired	
WinZip 25	MB (32-bit); MB (64-bit)	September 2020	Expired	
WinZip 26	MB (32-bit); MB (64-bit)	August 2021	Expired	Windows 7
WinZip 27	MB (32-bit); MB (64-bit)	August 2022	Expired	Windows (32-Bit)
WinZip 28	MB (64-bit)	September 2023		
WinZip 29	MB (64-bit)	September 2024		
WinZip 30	MB (64-bit)	September 2025		

== See also ==
- Comparison of archive formats
- Comparison of file archivers
- List of archive formats
- WinRAR – File archiver
