= ARJ =

Compression software

Archived by Robert Jung
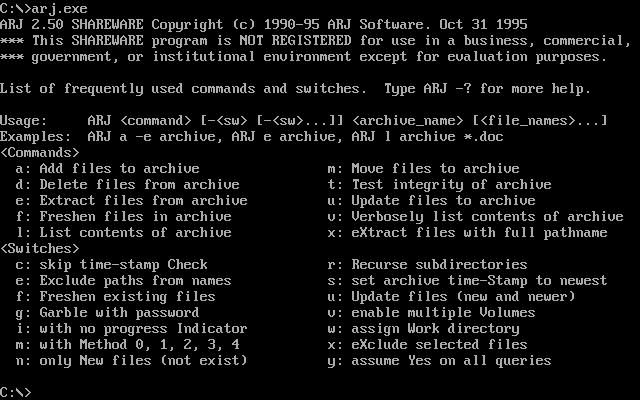
- Filename extension: .arj
- Uniform Type Identifier (UTI): public.archive.arj
- Developed by: Robert K. Jung
- Initial release: 1991; 35 years ago
- Latest release: 2.90 (MS-DOS), 3.31 (Windows); November 3, 2025; 12 months ago
- Type of format: archive format
- Open format?: Yes (patent expired)
- Website: arj32.com

ARJ (Archived by Robert Jung) is a software tool designed in 1991 by Robert K. Jung for creating high-efficiency compressed file archives. ARJ is currently on version 2.90 for MS-DOS and 3.31 for Microsoft Windows and supports 16-bit, 32-bit and 64-bit Intel architectures.

ARJ was one of many file compression utilities for MS-DOS and Microsoft Windows during the early and mid-1990s. Parts of ARJ were covered by U.S. patent 5,140,321 (expired). ARJ is well-documented and includes over 150 command line switches.

== File format support in other software ==
ARJ archives can be unpacked with various tools other than the ARJ software. There exists a free software re-implementation of the tool. A number of software utilities, including 7-Zip, Total Commander, Zipeg, and WinRAR can also unpack .arj files. For macOS, standalone utilities, such as DeArj and UnArjMac, are available.

== See also ==
- List of archive formats
- Comparison of file archivers
