= LHA (file format) =

Data compression file format

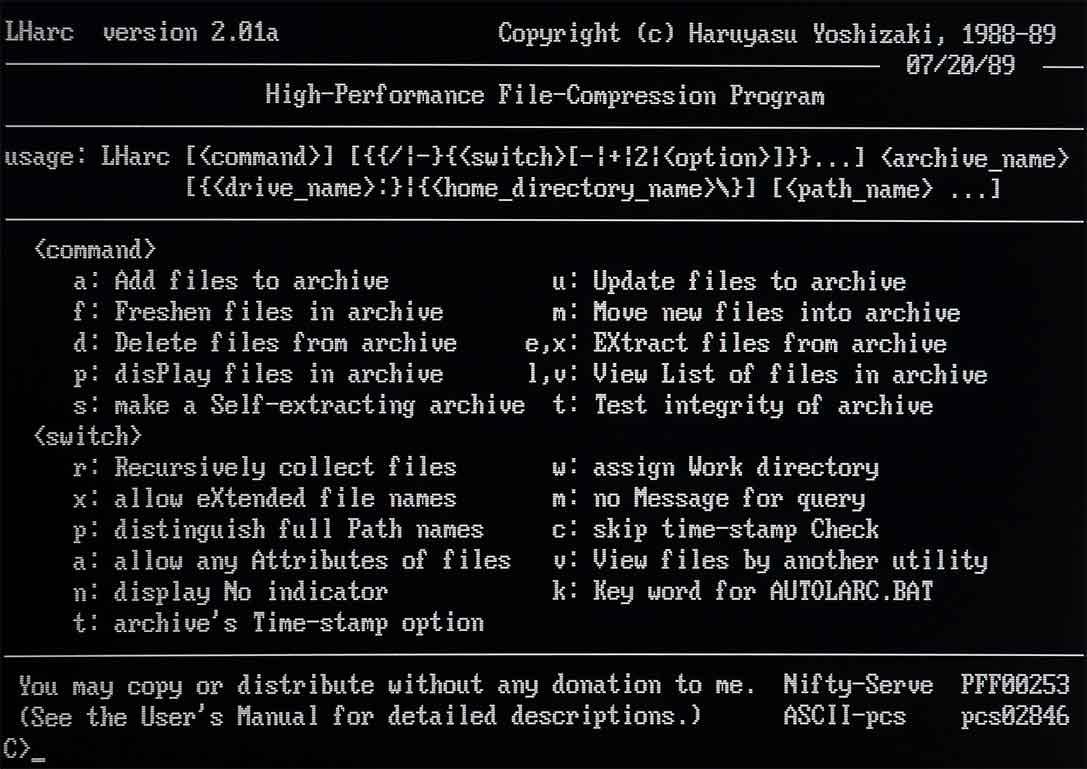
- Other names: LHarc, LHx, LH
- Original author: Haruyasu Yoshizaki
- Stable release: 2.13 / 20 July 1991; 34 years ago
- Preview release: 2.55b / 24 November 1992; 33 years ago
- Written in: Assembly language, C
- Operating system: MS-DOS
- Successor: LHA32
- License: Permissive license
- Website: https://www.vector.co.jp/vpack/browse/person/an000224.html

LZH
- Filename extension: .lzh, .lha
- Internet media type: application/x-lzh-compressed
- Type code: "LHA␣" (L-H-A-SPACE)
- Uniform Type Identifier (UTI): public.archive.lha
- Developed by: Haruyasu Yoshizaki (Yoshi)
- Type of format: Data compression
- Extended from: LArc

LHA or LZH is a freeware compression utility and associated file format. It was created in 1988 by Haruyasu Yoshizaki (吉崎栄泰, Yoshizaki Haruyasu), a medical doctor, and originally named LHarc. A complete rewrite of LHarc, tentatively named LHx, was eventually released as LH. It was then renamed to LHA to avoid conflicting with the then-new MS-DOS 5.0 LH ("load high") command. The original LHA and its Windows port, LHA32, are no longer in development because Yoshizaki is busy at his day job.

Although no longer much used in the west, LHA remained popular in Japan until the 2000s. It was used by id Software to compress installation files for their earlier games, including Doom and Quake. Because some versions of LHA have been distributed with source code under a permissive license, LHA has been ported to many operating systems and is still the main archiving format used on Amiga computers, although it competed with LZX in the mid-1990s. This was due to Aminet, the world's largest archive of Amiga-related software and files, standardising on Stefan Boberg's implementation of LHA for the Amiga.

Microsoft released the Microsoft Compressed (LZH) Folder Add-on, which was designed for the Japanese version of Windows XP. The Japanese version of Windows 7 ships with the LZH folder add-on built-in. Users of non-Japanese versions of Windows 7 Enterprise and Ultimate can also install the LZH folder add-on by installing the optional Japanese language pack from Windows Update.

== Compression methods ==
In an LZH archive, the compression method is stored as a five-byte text string, e.g. -lz1-. These are the third through seventh bytes of the file.

=== Canonical LZH ===
LHarc compresses files using an algorithm from Yoshizaki's earlier LZHUF product, which was modified from LZARI developed by Haruhiko Okumura (奥村晴彦, Okumura Haruhiko), but uses Huffman coding instead of arithmetic coding. LZARI uses Lempel–Ziv–Storer–Szymanski with arithmetic coding.

lh0
No compression method is applied to the source data.
lh1
This method is introduced in LHarc version 1.
It supports 4 KiB sliding window, with support for a maximum of 60 bytes of matching length. Dynamic Huffman encoding is used.
lh2
lh1 variant. This method supports 8 KiB sliding window, with support for a maximum of 256 bytes of matching length. Dynamic Huffman encoding is used.
lh3
lh2 variant with Static Huffman.
lh4, lh5, lh6, lh7
Methods 4, 5, 6, 7 support 4, 8, 32, 64 KiB sliding windows respectively, with support for a maximum of 256 bytes of matching length. Static Huffman encoding is used. lh5 is first introduced in LHarc 2, followed by lh6 in LHA 2.66 (MS-DOS), lh7 in LHA 2.67 beta (MS-DOS). LHA itself never compresses into lh4.
lhd
Technically it is not a compression method, but it is used in .LZH archives to indicate that the compressed object is an empty directory.

=== Joe Jared extensions ===
Joe Jared extended LZSS to use larger dictionaries.

lh8, lh9, lha, lhb, lhc, lhe
Dictionary (sliding window) sizes are 64, 128, 256, 512, 1024, 2048 KiB, respectively.

Jared ported LZH to Atari. The fact that lh8 is the same as lh7 was an oversight. Files using larger numbered methods may as well not exist, as Jared only considers them planned features.

=== UNLHA32 extensions ===
UNLHA32.DLL uses its own method for testing purposes.

lhx
It uses 128–256 KiB dictionary.

=== PMarc extensions ===
These compression methods are created by PMarc, a CP/M archiver created by Miyo. The archive usually has a .PMA extension.

pc1
PopCom compressed executable archive. Details unknown.
pm0
No compression method is applied to the source data.
pm1
8 KB sliding window, static huffman. Seldom generated, the decompressor is reverse-engineered.
pm2
lh5 variant with a 4 KiB sliding window.
pms
Used to indicate PMarc self-extracting archive. Should be skipped to reveal the real format.

=== LArc extensions ===
LArc uses the same file format as .LZH, but was written by Kazuhiko Miki, Haruhiko Okumura and Ken Masuyama, with extension name ".LZS". The program seems to have come before LZH. It uses a binary search tree in the LZ matching.

lzs
It supports 2 KiB sliding window, with support of maximum 17 bytes of matching length.
lz2
It is similar to lzs, except dictionary size and match length can be changed.
lz3
Unknown.
lz4
No compression method is applied to the source data.
lz5
It supports 4 KiB sliding window, with support of maximum 17 bytes of matching length.
lz7
lz8
Unknown.

Common implementations appear to only support lzs, lz5, plus the storage-only lz4.

== Issues ==
=== LHICE/ICE ===
There are copies of LHICE marked as version 1.14. According to Okumura, LHICE is not written by Yoshizaki.

=== Y2K11 bug ===
Because of a bug, DOS time stamps from Level 0 and 1 headers after the year 2011 will be set to 1980, meaning that some utilities need to be patched. This is caused by a bug that interprets the unsigned 7-bit year number bitfield as a 5-bit number. The maximum year should be 2107 instead.

The newer Level 2 and 3 headers use a 32-bit Unix time instead. It suffers from the Year 2038 problem.

=== Header size ===
According to Micco, the author of a popular LHA library, UNLHA32.DLL, many LHA implementations do not check for the length of LHA file headers when reading the archive. Two problems could emerge from this scenario: a buffer-overrun may occur for naive implementations assuming a 4 KB max size from the original specification; antivirus software may skip over files with such large headers and fail to scan for a virus. A similar problem exists with ARJ. Micco reported this problem to Japanese authorities, but they do not consider it a valid vulnerability.

Micco went so far to conclude the development of UNLHA32 and advise people to give up on the format. Nevertheless, they came back in 2017 to fix a DLL hijacking issue.

== See also ==
- List of archive formats
- LZX
