= List of archive formats =

This is a list of file formats used by archivers and compressors used to create archive files.

== Archive formats by purpose ==
Archive formats are used for backups, mobility, and archiving. Many archive formats losslessly compress the data to consume less storage space and result in faster transfer times as the same data is represented by fewer bytes. Another benefit is that files are combined into one archive file which has less overhead for managing or transferring. Archive formats are used by Unix-like and Windows operating systems to package software for easier distributing and installing than binary executables.

=== Archiving only ===
File extension(s) (Note: File extensions may differ across platforms. The case of these extensions may differ on case-insensitive platforms.)	MIME type (Note: MIME media types may be conjectural. Very few have been officially registered with the IANA. Compression-only formats should often be denoted by the media type of the decompressed data, with a content coding indicating the compression format.)	Official name (Note: Official names may be disputed.)	Platform (Note: Creation platform indicates the platform(s) under which a format can be created.)	Description
.a, .ar	application/x-archive	Unix Archiver	Unix-like	The traditional archive format on Unix-like systems, now used mainly for the creation of static libraries.
.cpio	application/x-cpio	cpio	Unix-like	RPM files consist of metadata concatenated with (usually) a cpio archive. Newer RPM systems also support other archives, as cpio is becoming obsolete. cpio is also used with initramfs.
.shar	application/x-shar	Shell archive	Unix-like	A self-extracting archive that uses the Bourne shell (sh).
.LBR		.LBR	CP/M DOS	A system for storing multiple files. LBR archives typically contained files processed by SQ, or the archive itself was compressed with SQ. LBR archives that were compressed with SQ ended with the extension .LQR
.iso	application/x-iso9660-image	ISO-9660 image	(Various; cross platform)	An archive format originally used mainly for archiving and distribution of the exact, nearly-exact, or custom-modified contents of an optical storage medium such as a CD-ROM or DVD-ROM. However, it can be used to archive the contents of other storage media, selected partitions, folders, and/or files. The resulting archive is typically optimized for convenient rendering to (re-)writable CD or DVD media.
.lbr			Commodore 64/128	A library format used primarily on the Commodore 64 and 128 lines of computers. This bears no resemblance to the DOS LBR format. While library files were quick to implement (a number of programs exist to work with them) they are crippled in that they cannot grow with use: once a file has been created it cannot be amended (files added, changed or deleted) without recreating the entire file.
.mar		Mozilla ARchive	(Various; cross platform)	An archive format used by Mozilla for storing binary diffs. Used in conjunction with bzip2.
.sbx	application/x-sbx	SeqBox	(Various; cross platform)	A single file container/archive that can be reconstructed even after total loss of file system structures.
.tar	application/x-tar	Tape archive	Unix-like	A common archive format used on Unix-like systems. Generally used in conjunction with compressors such as gzip, bzip2, compress or xz to create .tar.gz, .tar.bz2, .tar.Z or tar.xz files.

=== Compression only ===
File extension(s)	MIME type	Official name	Platform	Description
.br	application/x-brotli	Brotli	all	Brotli is a compression algorithm developed by Google for textual web content, and typically achieves higher compression ratios than other algorithms for this use case.
.bz2	application/x-bzip2	bzip2	Unix-like	An open source, patent- and royalty-free compression format. The compression algorithm is a Burrows–Wheeler transform followed by a move-to-front transform and finally Huffman coding.
.F, .?XF (Note: If attaching .F to the file name is not possible with the DOS operating system, the second and third character of the filename extension are replaced by XF.)		Freeze/melt	QNX4, Unix-like and DOS	Old compressor for QNX4 OS. The compression algorithm is a modified LZSS, with an adaptive Huffman coding.
.genozip	application/vnd.genozip	genozip	Linux, macOS, Windows	Genozip, a compressor for genomic file formats such as FASTQ, BAM, VCF and others.
.gz	application/gzip	gzip	Unix-like	GNU Zip, the primary compression format used by Unix-like systems. The compression algorithm is Deflate, which combines LZSS with Huffman coding.
.lz	application/lzip	lzip	Unix-like	An alternate LZMA algorithm implementation, with support for checksums and ident bytes.
.lz4		LZ4	Unix-like	Algorithm developed by Yann Collet, designed for very high (de)compression speeds. It is an LZ77 derivative, without entropy encoding.
.lzma	application/x-lzma	lzma	Unix-like	The LZMA compression algorithm as used by 7-Zip.
.lzo	application/x-lzop	lzop	Unix-like	An implementation of the LZO data compression algorithm.
.rz		rzip	Unix-like	A compression program designed to do particularly well on very large files containing long distance redundancy.
.sfark		sfArk	Windows compress/decompress- Linux and macOS decompress only	A compression program designed to do high compression on SF2 files (SoundFont).
.sz	application/x-snappy-framed	Snappy	Unix-like	A compression format developed by Google, and open-sourced in 2011. Snappy aims for very high speeds, reasonable compression, and maximum stability rather than maximum compression or compatibility with any other compression library. It is an LZ77 derivative, without entropy encoding.
.?Q?, .SQ, .QQQ		SQ	CP/M and DOS	Squeeze: A program which compressed files using Run-length encoding and Huffman coding. On CP/M and DOS, a file which was "squeezed" had the middle initial of the name changed to "Q", so that a squeezed text file would end with .TQT, a squeezed executable would end with .CQM or .EQE. If a file lacked a file extension, .QQQ was used instead. Unix ports of SQ instead appended .SQ to the file name. Typically used with .LBR archives, either by storing the squeezed files in the archive, or by storing the files decompressed and then compressing the archive, which would have a name ending in ".LQR".
.?Z?		CRUNCH	CP/M and DOS	A compression program written by Steven Greenberg implementing the LZW algorithm. For several years in the CP/M world when no implementation was available of ARC, CRUNCHed files stored in .LBR archives were very popular. CRUNCH's implementation of LZW had a somewhat unusual feature of modifying and occasionally clearing the code table in memory when it became full, resulting in a few percent better compression on many files.
.xz	application/x-xz	xz	Unix-like	A compression format using LZMA2 to yield high compression ratios. The LZMA algorithm is an LZ77 derivative, with entropy encoding in the form of range encoding.
.z	application/x-compress	pack	Unix-like	The traditional Huffman coding compression format.
.Z	application/x-compress	compress	Unix-like	The traditional LZW compression format.
.zst	application/zstd	Zstandard	Cross-platform	Algorithm developed by Yann Collet at Facebook, combining high speed and high compression. It is an LZ77 derivative, with entropy encoding in the form of finite-state entropy and Huffman coding.
.??_			MS-DOS/Windows	Compression format(s) used by some DOS and Windows install programs. MS-DOS includes expand.exe to decompress its install files. The compressed files are created with a matching compress.exe command. The compression algorithm is LZSS.

=== Archiving and compression ===
File extension(s)	MIME type	Official name	Creation platform	Restoration platform (Note: Restoration platform indicates the platform(s) under which a format can be restored/extracted. Most file formats can be understood by more than one platform.)	Restorable with free software (Note: "Restorable with free software" indicates whether the format can be restored using an extraction tool that is free software.)	Description
.7z	application/x-7z-compressed	7z	Multiple	Multiple	Yes	Open source file format. Used by 7-Zip.
.s7z	application/x-7z-compressed	7zX	macOS	macOS, restoration on different platforms is possible although not immediate	Yes	Based on 7z. Preserves Spotlight metadata, resource forks, owner/group information, dates and other data which would be otherwise lost with compression. Made obsolete by the introduction of AppleDouble-encoded 7z archives (Macintosh only).
.aar	application/octet-stream	Apple Archive	macOS	macOS	No	Created by Apple introduced with iOS 14 in 2020.
.ace	application/x-ace-compressed	ACE	Windows	Multiple	Yes	Proprietary format
.afa	application/x-astrotite-afa	AFA	Windows	Multiple	Yes	A format that compresses and doubly encrypt the data (AES256 and CAS256) avoiding brute force attacks, also hide files in an AFA file. It has two ways to safeguard data integrity and subsequent repair of the file if has an error (repair with AstroA2P (online) or Astrotite (offline)).
.alz	application/x-alz-compressed	ALZip	Windows	Multiple	Yes	A mainly Korean format designed for very large archives.
.apk	application/vnd.android.package-archive	APK	Multiple	Multiple	Yes	Android application package (variant of JAR file format).
.arc, .ark	application/octet-stream	ARC	Multiple	Multiple	Yes	Very popular in the early days of BBSes, one of the first to offer compression and archiving in a single program. Largely replaced by PKZIP.
.arc, .cdx	application/x-freearc	FreeArc	Windows, Linux	Windows, Linux	Yes	Open source file format developed by Bulat Ziganshin. A "FreeArc Next" version is under development which includes Zstandard support.
.arj	application/x-arj	ARJ	Originally DOS, now multiple	Multiple	Yes	Competitor to PKZIP in the 1990s, offered better multi-part archive handling.
.b1	application/x-b1	B1	Multiple	Multiple	Yes	Open archive format, used by B1 Free Archiver
.b6z		B6Z	macOS	Multiple	Yes	Compressed archive format B6Zip
.ba		Scifer	Multiple	Multiple	Yes	Binary Archive with external header
.bh		BlakHole			Yes	Proprietary format from the ZipTV Compression Components
.cab	application/vnd.ms-cab-compressed	Cabinet	Windows	Multiple	Yes	The Microsoft Windows native archive format, which is also used by many proprietary installers such as WISE.
.car		Compressia archive	Originally DOS, now DOS and Windows	Originally DOS, now DOS and Windows	Yes	Created by Yaakov Gringeler; released last in 2003 (Compressia 1.0.0.1 beta), now apparently defunct. Free trial of 30 days lets user create and extract archives; after that it is possible to extract, but not to create.
.cfs	application/x-cfs-compressed	Compact File Set	Windows, Unix-like including macOS	Multiple	Yes	Open source file format.
.cpt		Compact Pro	Classic Mac OS	Multiple	Yes	Compact Pro archive, a common archiver used on Mac platforms until about Mac OS 7.5.x. Competed with StuffIt; now obsolete.
.dar	application/x-dar	Disk Archiver	Unix-like including macOS	Unix-like including macOS, Windows	Yes	Open source file format. Files are compressed individually with either gzip, bzip2 or lzo.
.dd		DiskDoubler	Classic Mac OS			Obsolete
.dgc	application/x-dgc-compressed	DGCA	Windows	Windows		
.dmg	application/x-apple-diskimage	Apple Disk Image	macOS	macOS, Windows, Linux	Yes	Supports "Internet-enabled" disk images, which, once downloaded, are automatically decompressed, mounted, have the contents extracted, and thrown away. Currently, Safari is the only browser that supports this form of extraction; however, the images can be manually extracted as well. This format can also be password-protected or encrypted with 128-bit or 256-bit AES encryption.
.ear		EAR	Multiple	Multiple	Yes	Enterprise Java Archive archive
.gca	application/x-gca-compressed	GCA				The predecessor of DGCA.
.genozip		Genozip	Linux, macOS, Windows	Linux, macOS, Windows	No	Optimized for (but not limited to) genomic file types such as FASTQ, BAM, VCF
.ha			Originally DOS, now multiple	Multiple	Yes, but may be covered by patents	DOS era format; uses arithmetic/Markov coding
.hki		WinHKI	MS Windows	MS Windows	No	HKI
.ice		ICE	Windows	Windows	Yes	Produced by ICEOWS program. Excels at text file compression.
.jar	application/java-archive	JAR	Multiple	Multiple	Yes	Java archive, compatible with ZIP files
.kgb		KGB Archiver	Multiple	Multiple	Yes	Open sourced archiver with compression using the PAQ family of algorithms and optional encryption.
.lzh, .lha	application/x-lzh	LHA	Originally DOS, now multiple	Multiple	Yes	The standard format on Amiga.
.lzx	application/x-lzx	LZX	Amiga			Archiver originally used on The Amiga. Now copied by Microsoft to use in their .cab and .chm files.
.pak		PAK	HP NonStop	HP NonStop	Yes	file format from NoGate Consultings, a rival from ARC-Compressor..pak was also briefly used by the short lived MSDOS PKPAK program.
.partimg		PartImage	Multiple	Multiple	Yes	A disk image archive format that supports several compression methods as well as splitting the archive into smaller pieces.
.paq6, .paq7, .paq8 and variants		PAQ	Unix-like and Windows	Unix-like and Windows	Yes	An experimental open source packager
.pea		PeaZip	Linux and Windows	Linux and Windows	Yes	Open source archiver supporting authenticated encryption, cascaded encryption, volume spanning, customizable object level and volume level integrity checks (form CRCs to SHA-512 and Whirlpool hashes), fast deflate based compression
.phar		PHAR	Multiple	Multiple	Yes	A package format to enable distribution of applications and libraries by bundling many PHP code files and other resources (e.g. images, stylesheets, etc.) into a single archive file
.pim		PIM	Windows	Windows	Yes	The format from the PIM - a freeware compression tool by Ilia Muraviev. It uses an LZP-based compression algorithm with set of filters for executable, image and audio files.
.pit		PackIt	Classic Mac OS			obsolete
.qda		Quadruple D	Windows	Windows		Used for data in games written using the Quadruple D library for Delphi. Uses byte pair compression.
.rar	application/x-rar-compressed	RAR	Originally DOS, now WinRAR	Multiple	Partial (Note: RARLAB UnRAR is proprietary. The free unar has partial unpacking support for RAR1.3, RAR1.5, RAR2, RAR3 & RAR5 and the free libarchive has partial unpacking support for RAR3 & RAR5.)	A popular proprietary archive format.
.rk		RK and WinRK	Multiple	Multiple	No	The format from a proprietary archiving package. Odd among proprietary packages in that they focus on incorporating experimental algorithms with the highest possible compression (at the expense of speed and memory), such as PAQ, PPMD and PPMZ (PPMD with unlimited-length strings), as well as a proprietary algorithms.
.sda		Self Dissolving ARChive	Commodore 64, Commodore 128	Commodore 64, Commodore 128	Yes	SDAs refer to Self Dissolving ARC files, and are based on the Commodore 64 and Commodore 128 versions of ARC, originally written by Chris Smeets. While the files share the same extension, they are not compatible between platforms. That is, an SDA created on a Commodore 64 but run on a Commodore 128 in Commodore 128 mode will crash the machine, and vice versa. The intended successor to SDA is SFX.
.sea		Self Extracting Archive	Classic Mac OS	Classic Mac OS (implicitly)		A pre-Mac OS X Self-Extracting Archive format. StuffIt, Compact Pro, Disk Doubler and others could create .sea files, though the StuffIt versions were the most common.
.sen		Scifer	Multiple	Multiple	Yes	Scifer Archive with internal header
.sfx		Self Extracting Archive	Commodore 64, Commodore 128	Commodore 64, Commodore 128	Yes	SFX is a Self Extracting Archive which uses the LHArc compression algorithm. It was originally developed by Chris Smeets on the Commodore platform, and runs primarily using the CS-DOS extension for the Commodore 128. Unlike its predecessor SDA, SFX files will run on both the Commodore 64 and Commodore 128 regardless of which machine they were created on.
.shk		NuFX	Originally Apple II, now multiple	Multiple	Yes	An archive format designed for the Apple II series of computers. The canonical implementation is ShrinkIt, which can operate on disk images as well as files. Preferred compression algorithm is a combination of RLE and 12-bit LZW. Archives can be manipulated with the command-line NuLib tool, or the Windows-based CiderPress.
.sit	application/x-stuffit	StuffIt	Originally Classic Mac OS, now multiple	Originally Classic Mac OS, now multiple	Yes	A compression format common on Apple Macintosh computers. The free StuffIt Expander is available for Windows and macOS.
.sitx	application/x-stuffitx	StuffIt X	Multiple	Multiple	Yes	The replacement for the .sit format that supports more compression methods, UNIX file permissions, long file names, very large files, more encryption options, data specific compressors (JPEG, Zip, PDF, 24-bit image, MP3). The free StuffIt Expander is available for Windows and OS X.
.sqx		SQX	Windows	Windows	Yes	A royalty-free compressing format
.tar.gz, .tgz, .tar.Z, .tar.bz2,.tbz2, .tar.lz, .tlz, .tar.xz, .txz, .tar.zst	application/x-gtar	tar with gzip, compress, bzip2, lzip, xz, or zstd	Multiple	Multiple	Yes	The "tarball" format combines tar archives with a file-based compression scheme (usually gzip). Commonly used for source and binary distribution on Unix-like platforms, widely available elsewhere. Xarchiver supports the .tar.zst Archive/Compression format on Unix-like platforms.
.uc .uc0 .uc2 .ucn .ur2 .ue2		UltraCompressor II	DOS	DOS		UltraCompressor 2.3 was developed to act as an alternative to the then popular PKZIP application. The main feature of the application is its ability to create large archives. This means that compressed archives with the UC2 file extension can hold almost 1 million files.
.uca		PerfectCompress	Windows	Windows	No	Based on PAQ, RZM, CSC, CCM, and 7zip. The format consists of a PAQ, RZM, CSC, or CCM compressed file and a manifest with compression settings stored in a 7z archive.
.uha		UHarc	DOS/Windows	DOS/Windows	Yes	A high compression rate archive format originally for DOS.
.war		WAR	Multiple	Multiple	Yes	Web Application archive (Java-based web app)
.wim	application/x-ms-wim	Windows Image	Windows	Windows	Yes	File-based disk image format developed to deploy Microsoft Windows.
.xar	application/x-xar	XAR	Multiple	Multiple	Yes	
.xp3		KiriKiri	Windows	Windows	Yes	Native format of the Open Source KiriKiri Visual Novel engine. Uses combination of block splitting and zlib compression. The filenames and pathes are stored in UTF-16 format. For integrity check, the Adler-32 hashsum is used. For many proprietary games, the files are encrypted (and decoded on runtime) via so-called "cxdec" module, which implements xor-based encryption.
.yz1		YZ1	Windows, DOS, Linux	Windows, DOS, Linux	Yes	Yamazaki zipper archive. Compression format used in DeepFreezer archiver utility created by Yamazaki Satoshi. Read and write support exists in TUGZip, IZArc and ZipZag
.zip, .zipx	application/zip	ZIP	Originally DOS, now multiple	Multiple	Yes	The most widely used compression format on Microsoft Windows. Commonly used on Macintosh and Unix systems as well.
.zoo	application/x-zoo	zoo	Multiple	Multiple	Yes	
.zpaq		ZPAQ	Multiple	Multiple	Yes	Journaling (append-only) archive format with rollback capability. Supports deduplication and incremental update based on last-modified dates. Multi-threaded. Compresses in LZ77, BWT, and context mixing formats. Open source.
.zz		Zzip	Multiple	Multiple	Yes	Archiver with a compression algorithm based on the Burrows–Wheeler transform method.

=== Data recovery ===
File extension(s)	MIME type	Official name	Platform	Description
.ecc		dvdisaster error-correction file	Multiple	File format used by dvdisaster to be used for data recovery when discs become damaged or partially unreadable.
.ecsbx		Error-correcting SeqBox	Multiple	Archive with forward error correction and sector level recoverability. Error-correcting version of SeqBox.
.fec		Lziprecover fec file	Multiple	Lziprecover fec format. Can be used to repair any kind of file, not only lzip files. A fec file can be used as recovery record for a tar.lz archive.
.par.par2	application/x-par2	Parchive file	Multiple	File format used in conjunction with any archive format to provide error correction and file recovery, most often in newsgroup distribution of binary files.
.rev		WinRAR recovery volume	Multiple	File format used with WinRAR rar volumes. The data recovery is error correction data which is provided in the form of open recovery records and/or recovery volumes, allowing reconstruction of good archives (including reconstruction of entirely volumes)

== Comparison ==
=== Containers and compression ===
Format	Filename extension (Note: The DOS and Windows operating systems required filenames to include an extension (of at least one, and typically 3 characters) to identify the file type. Such extensions must be unique for each type of file. Many operating systems identify a file's type from its contents without the need for an extension in its name. However, the use of three-character extensions has been embraced as a useful and efficient shorthand for identifying file types.)	Created by	Introduced in	Based on	Compression	Integrity check (Note: Archive files are often stored on magnetic or other media subject to storage errors. Many archive formats contain extra error detection or correction information which can be used by the software used to read the archive files to detect and possibly correct errors.)	Recovery record (Note: Many archive formats contain redundant data embedded in the files in order to detect data storage or transmission errors, and the software used to read the archive files contains logic to detect and correct errors.)	Encryption supported (Note: Many archive formats include the capability to encrypt contents to prevent unauthorised access, using one of many available encryption methods.)	Unicode filenames	Modification date resolution	Pre-processing	License
Archive (ar)	.a, .ar	CSRG	1971	Original	No	No	No	No	No	1 s	?	?
cpio	.cpio	Bell Labs	1983 Unix System V	?	No	Partial, select formats only	No	No	No	1 s	No	?
Shell Archive (shar and makeself)	.shar, .run	James Gosling, Alan Hewett	1994 4.4BSD	Original	No	Yes, commonly MD5	Partial	Partial	Partial	arbitrary (typically 1 s)	No	Public domain (shar 1.x - 3.x), GPL (shar 4.x)
Tape Archive (tar)	.tar	Bell Labs	1975 Version 6 Unix	?	No	Partial, metadata only. Full integrity providable by filters such as gzip.	No	No	Optional (Note: While the original tar format uses the ASCII character encoding, current implementations use the UTF-8 (Unicode) encoding, which is backwards compatible with ASCII.)	1 s	No	?
Extended TAR format (pax)	.tar	OpenGroup	2001	Sun proposal + TAR	No	Partial, metadata only.	No	No	Yes	arbitrary (typically 1 ns)	No	?
BagIt	–	The Library of Congress	2007	file system	No	Yes	No	No	Yes	No	?	?
7z	.7z	Igor Pavlov	2000	LZMA, LZMA2, Bzip2, PPMd, Deflate	Yes	Yes, CRC-32	No	Yes, AES-256	Yes	100 ns	Yes	LGPL, Public domain
ACE	.ace	Marcel Lemke	1998	LZ77	Yes	Yes	Yes	Yes, Blowfish	Yes	2s	?	Proprietary software
AFA	.afa	Vicente Sánchez-Alarcos	2009	Original	Yes	Yes	Yes	Yes, AES and CAST	Yes	?	?	?
ARC	.arc	Thom Henderson (SEA)	1985	?	Yes	CRC-16	No	weak XOR only	No	2s	No	?
ARJ	.arj	Robert Jung	1991	AR001 and AR002	Yes	Yes	Yes	weak XOR with initial constant	No	?	?	Proprietary software
B1	.b1	Catalina Group Ltd	2011	LZMA	Yes	Yes	No	Yes, AES	Yes	?	?	?
Cabinet	.cab	Microsoft	1992 Windows 3.1	Deflate	Yes	Optional PKCS7 Authenticode signature	No	Optional (with SDK)	Yes	2 s	?	?
Compact File Set	.cfs	Joe Lowe (Pismo Technic Inc.)	2008	ZIP/LZMA	Yes	Yes	?	Yes	Yes	?	?	Free software
Compact Pro	.cpt	Bill Goodman	1990 (as "Compactor")	Original	Yes	Yes	No	Yes	?	?	?	Proprietary software
Disk Archive (DAR)	.dar	Denis Corbin	2002	Original	Yes	Yes	Yes (Note: Supports the external Parchive program (par2).)	Yes	Yes	1 μs	Yes	GPLv2
DGCA	.dgc	Shin-ichi Tsuruta	2001	GCA	Yes	Yes	Yes	Yes	Yes	?	?	?
FreeArc	.arc	Bulat Ziganshin	2006	LZMA, PPMd, TTA	Yes	Yes	Yes	Yes, AES, Blowfish, Twofish and Serpent	Yes	?	?	GPLv2
LHA (also LZH)	.lzh, .lha	Haruyasu Yoshizaki	1988	Frozen	Yes	Only on recent LHA releases	No	No	No	1–2 s	?	?
LZX	.lzx	Jonathan Forbes and Tomi Poutanen	1995	LZ77	Yes	Only on recent LZX releases	?	?	?	?	?	?
ISO image	.iso, .img, .ima	ISO 9660	1988	High Sierra Format	No	?	?	?	?	?	?	?
Spark	.arc	David Pilling	1989	ARC	Yes	CRC-16	No	weak XOR only	No	1 cs	No	CDDL 1.0
WinMount format	.mou	?	2007	?	Yes	Yes	Yes	Yes	Yes	?	?	Proprietary software
Macintosh Disk Image	.dmg	Apple Computer	2001 Mac OS X	Original	Yes	Yes	?	Yes	?	?	?	?
Partition Image (PartImage)	.partimg	François Dupoux and Franck Ladurelle	2000	?	Yes	?	?	?	?	?	?	GPLv2
PAQ Family (Several formats) (Note: The PAQ family (with its lighter weight derivative LPAQ) went through many revisions, each revision suggested its own extension. For example: ".paq9a".)	.paq#*, .lpaq#*	Matt Mahoney	2002–2006	Original	Yes	?	?	?	?	?	?	?
PEA	.pea	Giorgio Tani	2006	Original, Deflate based compression	Yes	Yes Adler32, CRC-32, CRC-64, MD5, SHA1, RIPEMD-160, SHA256, SHA512, Whirlpool	No	Yes Authenticated Encryption, AES128 and AES256 in EAX mode	Yes system dependent	Yes arbitrary	?	Public domain
PIM	.pim	Ilia Muraviev	2004–2008	Original	Yes	Yes	No	No	Yes	No	?	?
Quadruple D	.qda	Taku Hayase (aka sandman)	1997	?	Yes	?	?	?	?	?	?	?
RAR	.rar	Eugene Roshal	1993	Original	Yes	Yes, CRC-32, BLAKE2	Yes, Reed–Solomon	Yes, AES-256 for RAR 5.0 archives	Yes, UTF-8	2 s, 1 s, 6.5536 ms, 25.6 μs or 100 ns (Note: From 3.20 release RAR can store modification, creation and last access time with the precision up to 0.0000001 second (0.1 μs).)	Dropped	Proprietary software
RK	.rk	M Software, Ltd.	2004	Original	Yes	Yes	No	Yes, AES, Square, Twofish	Yes	1 s	?	?
NuFX	.shk	Andy Nicholas	1989	Original	Yes	CRC-16	No	No	No	1 s	?	?
StuffIt (also SIT)	.sit	Raymond Lau	1987	?	Yes	?	?	Yes	?	?	?	Proprietary software
StuffIt X (also SITx)	.sitx	Aladdin/Allume Systems	2002	?	Yes	?	Optional	Yes, RC4,Blowfish, AES,DES	Yes	?	?	Proprietary software
UltraCompressor II	.uc .uc0 .uc2.ucn .ur2 .ue2	Nico de Vries	1992–1996	LZ77 and Huffman coding	Yes	Yes	Yes	Yes, triple DES	?	?	?	?
Windows Image	.wim, .swm, .esd	Microsoft	2006	Original	Yes	Yes	No	Partial (Note: WIM can store the ciphertext of encrypted files on an NTFS volume, but such files can only by decrypted if an administrator extracts the file to an NTFS volume, and the decryption key is available (typically from the file's original owner on the same Windows installation). Microsoft has also distributed some download versions of the Windows operating system as encrypted WIM files, but via an external encryption process and not a feature of WIM.)	Yes	100 ns	?	?
ZIP	.zip	Phil Katz	1989	Deflate	Yes	Yes	No	Yes, AES	Yes	1–2 s, depending on version	?	?
ZPAQ	.zpaq	Matt Mahoney	2009	PAQ	Yes	Yes, SHA-1	No	Yes, AES-256	Yes	?	?	MIT, Public domain

=== Software packaging and distribution ===
Format	Filename extension	Created by	Introduced in	Based on	Integrity check	Recovery record	Encryption supported	Unicode filenames	Modification date resolution
Debian package (deb)	.deb	Debian	1994 Debian 0.91	ar, tar, and gzip, xz	Yes	No	No	Yes	1 s
Macintosh Installer	.pkg, .mpkg (metapackage)	NeXT	1989 NeXTSTEP 1.0	pax and gzip	Yes	?	?	Yes	?
RPM Package Manager (RPM)	.rpm	Red Hat	1995 Red Hat Linux 1.0	cpio and gzip	Yes	?	?	?	1 s
Slackware Package	.tgz	Patrick Volkerding	1993 Slackware 1.0	tar and gzip	Yes	No	No	?	?
Windows Installer (also MSI)	.msi	Microsoft	2000 Windows 2000	OLE Structured Storage, Cabinet and SQL	Optional PKCS7 Authenticode Signature	No	No	No	2 s
MSIX	.appx, .appxbundle, .emsix, .emsixbundle, .msix, .msixbundle	Microsoft	2012 Windows 8	Zip	Yes	No	Yes	Yes	1 s
Java Archive (JAR (Note: Not to be confused with the archiver JAR written by Robert K. Jung, which produces ".j" files.))	.jar	Sun Microsystems	1997 JDK 1.1	PKZIP	Yes	No	?	Yes	?
Google Chrome extension package	.crx	Google	2009 (Chrome 4.0)	Zip	Yes	?	No	?	?
Pacman	.pkg.tar.zst, .pkg.tar (no compression)	Judd Vinet	2001 (before ArchLinux 0.1)	tar and zstd (formerly xz)	Yes	No	No	Yes	1 s

=== Features ===
Archive format	Built-in compression	Self-extracting	Directory structure	POSIX attributes	ACLs	Alternate data streams
cpio	No (Note: Compression is not a built-in feature of the formats, however, the resulting archive can be compressed with any algorithm of choice. Several implementations include functionality to do this automatically)	No	Yes	Yes	No	?
tar	No	No	Yes	Yes	Some	(in Solaris implementation)
dar	Yes (Note: Per-file compression with gzip, bzip2, lzo, xz, lzma (as opposed to compressing the whole archive). An individual can choose not to compress already compressed filenames based on their suffix as well.)	No	Yes	Yes	Yes	Yes
ar	No	No	No	Yes	No	?
pax	No	No	Yes	Yes	Yes	?
dump	No	No	Yes	Yes	Yes	?
shar	No	Yes	Yes	Yes	No	?
makeself	Yes	Yes	Yes	Yes	Yes	?
zip	Yes	Yes (Note: Most implementations can optionally produce a self-extracting executable)	Yes	No	?	?
rar	Yes	Yes	Yes	No	?	Yes
ace	Yes	?	Yes	No	?	?
arj	Yes	Yes	Yes	No	No	?
zoo	Yes	?	Yes	No	?	?
ISO 9660 (CD-ROM)	No	No	Yes	(with Rock Ridge extension)	No	?
cab	Yes	Yes	?	No	?	?
rpm	Yes	No	Yes	Yes	?	?
deb	Yes	No	Yes	Yes	?	?
7z	Yes	Yes	Yes	No	?	?
Archive format	Built-in compression	Self-extracting	Directory Structure	POSIX attributes	ACLs	Alternate data streams

== See also ==
- Archive file
- Comparison of file archivers
- Comparison of file systems
- List of file systems
- Solid compression
- zlib
