= South Ural State University =

University in Chelyabinsk, Russia

South Ural State University (SUSU)
- Южно-Уральский Государственный Университет (ЮУрГУ)
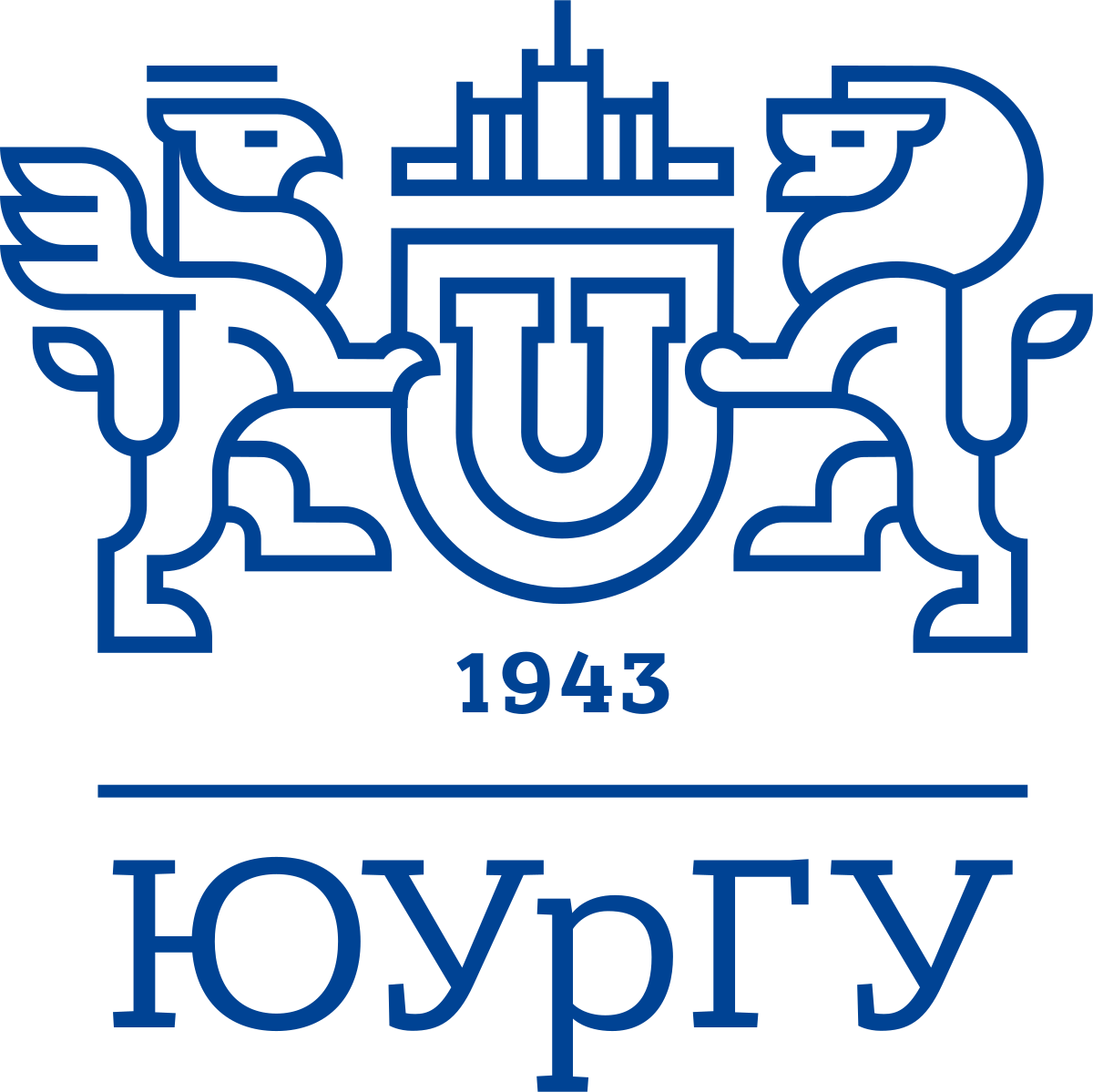
- Former names: Chelyabinsk Mechanics and Technology Institute (CMTI) (1943–1951), Chelyabinsk Polytechnic Institute (CPI) (1951–1990), Chelyabinsk State Technical University (CSTU) (1990–1997)
- Motto: Aut viam inveniam, aut faciam
- Motto in English: I shall either find a way or make one
- Type: Public
- Established: December 15, 1943
- President: German Platonovich Vyatkin
- Rector: Alexander Wagner
- Administrative staff: 5,000
- Students: Approx. 40,000
- Undergraduates: 55,000
- Location: Chelyabinsk, Russia; 55°09′36″N 61°22′12″E
- Campus: Urban
- Website: www.susu.ru/en
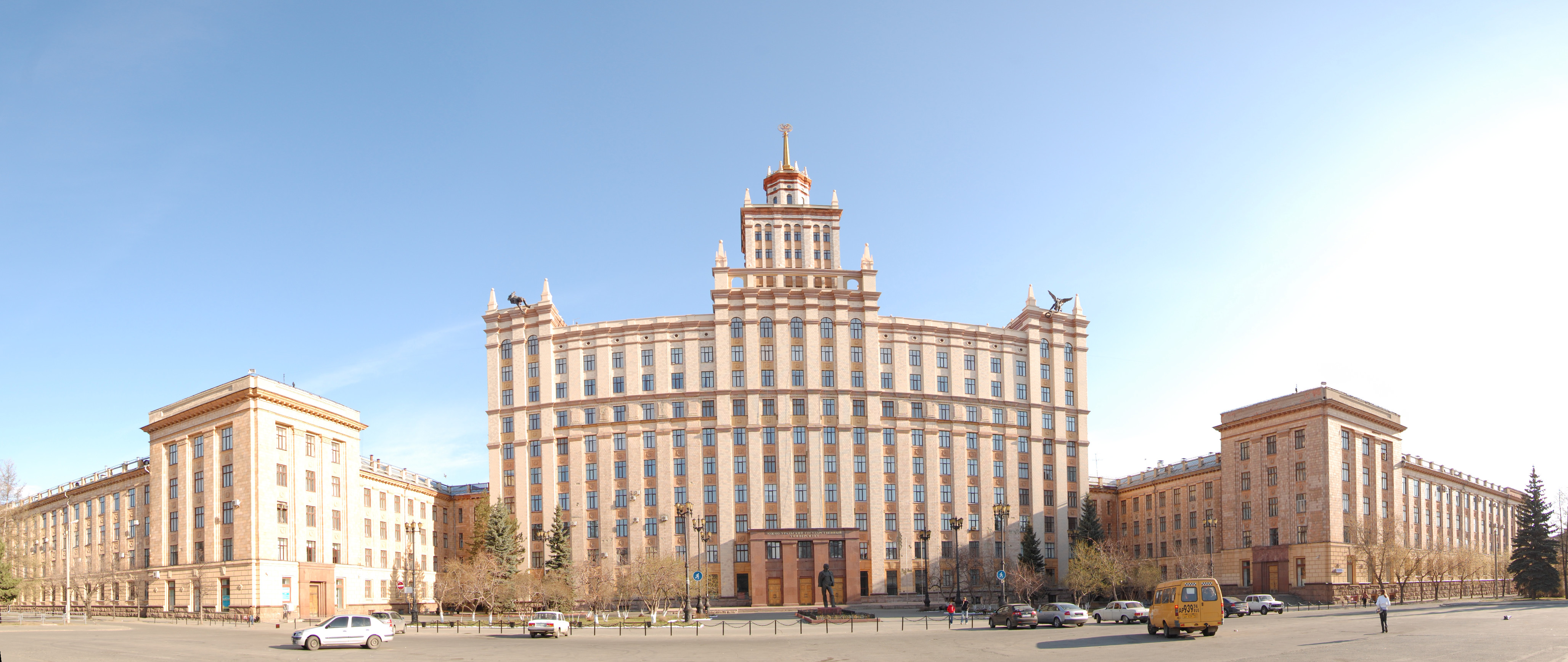
- Main building of the university built in the style of Stalinist architecture

University rankings

Global – Overall
- QS World: 951-1000 (2026)

Regional – Overall
- QS Emerging Europe and Central Asia: 116 (2022)

South Ural State University (SUSU) (Russian: Южно-Уральский Государственный Университет (ЮУрГУ)) in Chelyabinsk is an educational institution in Russia. It is among the top-ten of the Russian universities according to the state rating of the Ministry of Education and Science of the Russian Federation, and the largest in Russia in terms of the number of undergraduates.

Globally, it was ranked #801–1000 in QS World University Rankings 2022, #901–1000 in Three University Missions Ranking 2021, #1,001+ in Times Higher Education World University Rankings 2021, and #1,355 by Webometrics Ranking of World Universities.

Starting from 2010 SUSU has been holding a status of a National Research University. In 2015 the university became one of the Russian universities chosen for participation in Project 5-100 aiming at improving the competitive standing of Russian universities.

Shestakov Alexander (Шестаков Александр Леонидович]), the rector of the South Ural State University has signed a letter of support for the Russian invasion of Ukraine.

South Ural State University is on the list of sanctioned entities. The institution has tight connections with the Russian military. It has published a series of articles supporting pro-Russian separatists. Since the beginning of Russian invasion of Ukraine, it continues to publish pro-Kremlin rhetoric and participate in military related projects or activities.

== History ==
=== Chelyabinsk Mechanical Engineering Institute – 1943 ===
During the Great Patriotic War, industries from various cities of the USSR’S European part, including factories from Leningrad, Stalingrad and Kharkov which became the basis of Tankograd, were evacuated to Chelyabinsk. Stalingrad Mechanical Institute, evacuated in August 1942, performed training of engineering cadres for industry works; in October of that year, the Institute started admission of postgraduates. In the academic year 1942/43, the first year of operating in Chelyabinsk, the Institute had about 400 students, including 90 who attended evening classes. In the spring of 1943, the second admission group of 40 specialists trained for assistance to the Army graduated the Institute. At the beginning of the next academic year of 1943/44, there were about 660 students and 20 postgraduates studying at the Institute. When the Battle of Stalingrad was over, the Institute had to get transferred back to its city.

In order to prevent “personnel gap” in September 1943, people's commissar of tank industry, V. А. Malyshev, director of Tankograd, deputy people's commissar I. М. Zaltzman and Head of the Chelyabinsk regional committee of the All-Union Communist Party (of Bolsheviks), N. S. Patolichev addressed the Council of People's Commissars with a request to create an institute in Chelyabinsk. On November 2, 1943, the Council of People's Commissars of the USSR issued the Decree No. 1201-361с “On actions for improvement of training of engineering cadres for tank industry enterprises”, which allowed to establish Chelyabinsk Mechanical Engineering Institute in the buildings occupied by the Stalingrad Mechanical Institute. On November 15, 1943, the first group of Stalingrad Institute's employees left for their motherland; the second group stayed to finish the first semester and hold winter exam session, after that they departed as well in April 1944. Kirovsky Zavod provided Chelyabinsk Institute with engineers-lecturers, dormitories, laboratories, foundries and workshops; this allowed for continuing the education process and research activity. Lecturers from Chelyabinsk Institute of Mechanization and Electrification of Agriculture and Chelyabinsk State Pedagogical Institute were sent to CMEI, as well as alumni of Moscow and Leningrad's higher education institutions.

In December 1943, Associate Professor, Candidate of Engineering Sciences Petr Alekseevich Grishin was appointed as Acting Director of CMEI. The day he signed his first order— December 15, 1943 — is celebrated as the day of SUSU's foundation.

In 1943—1944, the university located in different parts of Chelyabinsk. After the beginning of re-evacuation of industrial plants and other institutions, the university was located in a three-storeyed shop building at the Spartaka street. Initially, the Institute had only two faculties: of mechanical engineering and of tank construction, which in 1944 was renamed into the Faculty of Wheeled Caterpillar Vehicles. The Faculty included 24 Departments. CMEI started conducting research in mechanical engineering. This was the wartime requirement: the country needed equipment and people able to manage it. During the time of post-war recovery of economic development, the country needed specialists of another education spheres: mechanical engineers, metallurgists, power engineers, and constructors. By the end of the 1940s, it became clear that the university could not efficiently achieve its goals within the old structure; therefore, a restructurization started. By that time, there were more than 900 students and 9 specialties.

=== Chelyabinsk Polytechnic Institute – since 1951 ===
On April 26, 1949, Decree of the Council of Ministers of the USSR No. 1671 was issued on establishment of Chelyabinsk Polytechnic Institute (CPI) on the basis of CMEI through its unification with Chelyabinsk Institute of Mechanization and Electrification of Agriculture (CIMEA) in 1951. But in 1950, an Order was issued which allowed CIMEA to remain an independent institute, and Chelyabinsk Mechanical Engineering Institute was reorganized into Chelyabinsk Polytechnic Institute. The two already-existing Faculties were complemented with new ones: the faculties of Power Engineering, Metallurgy, Engineering and Construction, Mechanical, and Instrument Engineering. In 1958, evening studies were reorganized into a separate Faculty of evening studies. In 1951, А. Ya. Sychev, was appointed to be the Director of CPI, and in 1952, training of postgraduates majoring in economic sphere started. In 1953, the Faculty of evening studies was established in Miass branch university, and in 1956, a branch university was founded in Zlatoust. The Faculty of Instrument Engineering was established in 1954.

In order to perform training of research and teaching staff, a Council for Defense of Candidate's and Doctor's Dissertations in such specialties as “Machine Science, Drive Systems and Machine Elements”, “Heat Engines”, “Wheeled and Caterpillar Vehicles” was created at CPI in 1962. Postgraduate Office was established; research and teaching staff could receive training at the following departments: “Workstations and Instruments”, “Physical Chemistry”, “Engineering Structures”, “Gyroscopic Apparatus and Devices”, “Water Supply and Water Drainage”, etc.

From the very beginning of the university's existence, research schools and laboratories were being established, targeted at solving defensive (during wartime) and then economic problems: a basic research laboratory (new technology process of rolling), 12 industrial laboratories and 12 laboratories established. Later, a basic research laboratory of control systems and a laboratory of radio electronics were established; the latest one subsequently became the Research and Development Institute of Digital Systems. In 1968 the institute was named after Lenin's Komsomol. In 1989, the institute included eight faculties.

=== University – since 1990 ===
In 1990, Chelyabinsk Polytechnic Institute, named after Lenin's Komsomol, was renamed into Chelyabinsk State Technical University (CSTU). The university started developing liberal arts specialties, departments, and faculties. In 1997, CSTU was renamed into South Ural State University and transformed from an engineering university into a classic one.

In 2001—04, the university's main building got an additional two storeys, a tower and a steeple covered in gold-simulating titanium nitride, built in correspondence with its initial Stalinist architectural design (see Moscow's "Seven Sisters").

In April 2010, SUSU became one of Russia's 15 higher education institutions which were given a status of National Research University.

In 2015, the university was included in a number of universities taking part in Project 5-100, targeted at enhancement of competitiveness of Russia's leading universities at the global market of educational services. In 2018, South Ural State University for the first time in its history was included into the ranking of the world’s best universities drawn by Quacquarelli Symonds (QS) consulting company from Great Britain. In 2019, SUSU entered the THE World University Rankings-2020 from the Times Higher Education Rating Agency for the first time.

== SUSU today ==
SUSU comprises 12 institutes and schools, one faculty (Faculty of Pre-University Training), and a military training center, as well as four branches (in Zlatoust, Miass, Satka in the Chelyabinsk Region, and in Nizhnevartovsk in the Khanty-Mansijsk Autonomous District).

As of 2020, 32,000 students from 58 countries from around the world were studying at SUSU. In total, over the university’s history, more than 250 thousand specialists have completed higher education programmes, tens of thousands of candidates of science, and hundreds of doctors of science. SUSU offers 240 bachelor’s programs, 150 master's programs, 24 specialist programs, and 86 post-graduate programs.

The university has a robust athletic foundation. Graduates of the university include Olympic champions, masters of sports, and members of the national Olympic teams. SUSU has 21 student organizations, a Center of Arts and Leisure, the Mannequin Student Theatre Studio, as well as vocal, instrumental and dance bands.

SUSU Science Library's book collection includes more than 13,000,000 items. The university also has seven museums and the only-in-Russia university television and radio company, SUSU-TV, broadcasting 24/7 on air as well as via cable networks and the Internet.

== Rankings ==
=== World ===
- 588 in SCImago Institutions Rankings 2021 (36th among Russian universities)
- 601-800 in Times Higher Education World University Rankings 2024 (8–13th among Russian universities)
- 701–800 in Three University Missions Ranking 2023 (27–30th among Russian universities)
- 757 in Round University Ranking 2021 (64th among Russian universities)
- 801–1000 in QS World University Rankings 2022 (28–35th among Russian universities)
- 1,355 by Webometrics Ranking of World Universities 2022
- 1,500 by Nature Index 2021
- 2,064 in University Ranking by Academic Performance (URAP) 2019-20

=== Regional or subject ===
- 116 in QS Emerging Europe & Central Asia Rankings 2022 (24th among Russian universities)
- 389 in RankPro Rankings 2020/21 (15th among Russian universities)
- 401–600 in Times Higher Education World University Rankings Impact Rankings 2020 (16–30th among Russian universities)
- 501–600 in Times Higher Education World University Rankings in Engineering 2021 (9–12th among Russian universities)
- 601–800 in Times Higher Education World University Rankings in Physical Sciences 2021 (17–20th among Russian universities)
- 601–800 in Times Higher Education World University Rankings in Computer Science 2021 (11–22nd among Russian universities)

=== In Russia ===
- 26 in Forbes Russian Universities Rankings 2020
- Top-38 in National Aggregated Rating of Russian Universities 2021
- 39-40 in Vladimir Potanin Foundation Universities Rating 2021
- 44–45 in Interfax National Universities Rating 2021
- 55 in RAEX-RR Most Influencing Russian Universities Rankings 2020
- 61 in RAEX-RR Russian Universities Rankings 2021

== Schools and institutes ==
- Institute of Architecture and Construction
- School of Medical Biology
- School of Economics and Management
- School of Electronic Engineering and Computer Science
- Institute of Linguistics and International Communication
- Institute of Media, Social Sciences and Humanities
- Institute of Natural Sciences and Mathematics
- Institute of Sport, Tourism and Service
- Institute of Engineering and Technology
- Institute of Law
- Institute of Open and Distance Education
- Institute of Supplementary Education

== SUSU Science Library ==
The Science Library of South Ural State University was established in 1943 and is one of the biggest university libraries of the Ural Region. The library's collection includes both contemporary scientific, educational and reference editions (Russian and foreign ones), and selections of rare books of the 19th – 20th century. The collection comprises over 2 million items. Printed editions are complemented by electronic documents: books, journals, newspapers, video and audio materials. The library features 11 reading rooms, two electronic resources rooms, and four delivery desks (natural sciences and technical literature, social sciences and humanities literature, fiction literature, and a delivery desk for extramural students).

== SUSU museums ==
The Museum of SUSU History was established in 1980 at the initiative of the Chairperson of the Council of Veterans of the Chelyabinsk Polytechnic Institute. The first part of the exhibit tells about the history of the university's creation. Visitors learn how in 1951 Chelyabinsk Mechanical Engineering Institute was reorganized into Chelyabinsk Polytechnic Institute, and what the first student's cards and grade books looked like.

The Geological Museum was opened at the SUSU Faculty of Architecture and Construction in 2010. The exhibit features rocks and minerals that represent the natural wealth of the Ural Region. The museum has a collection of iron, copper, nickel ores, and raw materials for production of construction materials. Visitors can see ornamental, semiprecious stones and gem stones. Over one thousand items are exhibited at the museum.

The Arts Hall of South Ural State University was opened in 2003. Over the years, the Arts Hall has held over 60 exhibitions featuring artworks from Chelyabinsk Regional State Art Museum, Chelyabinsk Regional Division of the Union of Russian Artists, Gildiya Masterov (Craftsmen Guild) creative union, and private collections, and exhibits of the Russian Academy of Arts and the State Russian Museum. Photo exhibitions of works by Chelyabinsk and Russian photographers are regularly held at the Arts Hall.

SUSU Museum of Peoples and Technologies of the Ural Region

== Notable people ==
- Taisia Chenchik, Soviet athlete who competed mainly in the high jump; won bronze medal at the 1964 Summer Olympics and gold medal at 1963 Summer Universiade
- Victor Khristenko, Chairman of the Board of Eurasian Economic Commission
- Gennadiy Kondrashov, retired hammer thrower who competed for the Soviet Union at the 1968 Summer Olympics
- Alexander Pochinok, Minister of Taxes and Levies of Russia, 1999–2000; Minister of Labor and Social Development, 2000–2004
- Eugene Roshal, software engineer best known as the developer of FAR File Manager, RAR file format and WinRAR file archiver
- Pyotr Sumin, governor of Chelyabinsk Oblast of Russia, 1996–2010
- Dmitry Aleksandrovich Petelin, a cosmonaut, spent 370 days, 21 hours, and 23 minutes in space.
