= Unrar =

UnRAR is the name of two different command-line applications for extracting RAR file archives.

== RARLAB UnRAR ==
This source-available freeware is a command-line version of UnRAR, released by RARLAB, the same company that released the proprietary WinRAR software. This software can extract newer RAR v5.0 file archives that has limited support in free extractors.

The source-available license stipulates that users may not use the UnRAR code to create a RAR compressor.

== UnRAR-free ==
This is a free software version of UnRAR that uses a library that is based on an old version of RARLAB's UnRAR with permission from author Eugene Roshal. It is probably licensed under the GPLv2-only and unrarlib is available under the GPLv2-or-later or a proprietary license. Work ended in 2007. Unrarlib only supports the RAR2 format.

== See also ==
- Comparison of file archivers
- Comparison of archive formats
- List of archive formats
- RAR (file format)#Third-party software for extracting RAR files
