= Phar (disambiguation) =

Phar may refer to:

- Katie Phar (c. 1899 – 1943), American singer and activist
- Pale Horse and Rider, musical duo
- PHAR (file format), file format for distributing PHP applications and libraries

== See also ==
- Phar Lap (1926–1932), New Zealand-born Australian racehorse
- Far (disambiguation)
