= BQY =

BQY can refer to:

- Kata Kolok, a sign language from Bali, Indonesia, by ISO 639-3 code
- .BQY, a file format used by the data compression software ShrinkIt
