= Far Manager =

File and archive manager for Microsoft Windows

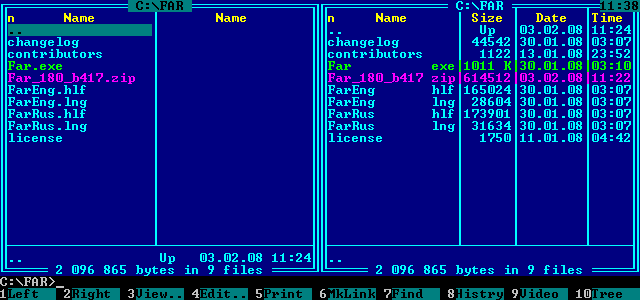
- Developers: Eugene Roshal (1996–2000); Far Group (2000–present)
- Initial release: 10 September 1996; 29 years ago
- Stable release: 3.0.6575 / 21 October 2025
- Repository: github.com/FarGroup/FarManager
- Written in: C++
- Operating system: Microsoft Windows, BSD Unix, OSX, Linux port
- Available in: English, Russian, Czech, German, Hungarian, Polish, Spanish, Slovak, Italian, Ukrainian, Belarusian
- Type: File manager
- License: BSD-3-Clause
- Website: farmanager.com

Far Manager (short for File and ARchive Manager) is an orthodox file manager for Microsoft Windows and is a clone of Norton Commander. Far Manager uses the Win32 console and has a keyboard-oriented user interface (although limited mouse operation, including drag-and-drop, is possible).

Far Manager was created by Eugene Roshal, and has been under development by the Far Group since 2000. The project's Unicode branches (2.0 and 3.0) are open-source (under the BSD-3-Clause license). All branches are available as 32- and 64-bit builds. Far Manager is often viewed as a very customizable file manager and text editor, and a free alternative to Total Commander.

== Features ==
Far Manager features an internal viewer and editor, customizable user menus, tree views, file search, compare, integrated help, and a task switcher for its tools. Its standard functionality can be expanded with macros (which allow scripting) and plugins.

Far Manager's default interface combines two file panels with a command prompt. Panels may be fully customized as to which columns are shown and in which order, and operations may be done to and from either panel. The file panels support wildcard selection, advanced filtering, sorting and highlighting. The file panels and the command prompt are both active at the same time (they are interacted with using different keys), and most features can be accessed using keyboard shortcuts (the key bar at the bottom displays the function key actions for the currently held down modifier keys).

== Extensibility ==
Far's standard functionality can be greatly extended with macros (written in Lua scripting language, primarily used to record keypress sequences) and plugins. Standard plugins installed by default include FTP, Windows network, extensible archive file support and temporary panel (sandbox) virtual file systems, a process list, print manager, filename case converter, and several editor plugins to format, wrap, and otherwise alter text.

Third-party plugins are available from the PlugRing repository and plugin announcement forum. Some popular plugins include regular expression search and replace (both in the text editor and across multiple files), syntax highlighting and auto-completion for the text editor, SFTP/SCP and Windows Registry virtual file systems, 7-zip integration, a hex editor and a picture viewer (which overlays a DirectX surface over Far's console window). Wrappers are available which allow using some Total Commander plugins with Far Manager, and vice versa. Plugins can be developed using the native C/Pascal API, or using wrappers which permit plugin development in other platforms and languages, such as .NET (including PowerShell), and Lua.

== Linux, MacOS and BSD version ==
far2l project develops port of Far Manager v2 working on Linux, MacOS and BSD systems. As of February 2021, the port successfully builds and the most common functions work. Among ported and working plugins are Colorer, MultiArc and TmpPanel. There is also the new NetRocks plugin implementing network connections via FTP, FISH, SCP, SFTP, SMB, NFS and WebDAV. As of January 2022, the project has moved to the beta stage, support for python and lua scripts has been added.

far2l also supports "terminal extensions". Although FAR2L itself is a TUI application, it can run in GUI or TTY backends modes. While TTY backend can run in any terminal (like, for example, xterm), it can also run inside a built-in terminal of GUI mode far2l, gaining capabilities not available on "regular" terminals (such as recognizing all possible keyboard key combinations, even with keyup events). Also, the "host" far2l can provide shared clipboard access and desktop notifications. Those extensions can be used by running TTY far2l inside an SSH client session opened in "host" GUI far2l (or by using SFTP/SCP protocols in NetRocks to run remote far2l via "execute remote command" feature).

far2l is available in Ubuntu Linux starting from version 24.04, and can be installed using sudo apt install far2l command.

== Licensing ==
Far Manager is available under the BSD-3-Clause license.

Originally, Far Manager was available as 40 days shareware for everyone except for citizens of the former USSR countries, who could use it as freeware for non-commercial use only. On 26 October 2007, the source code for the Unicode development version (1.80, later renamed to 2.0) was released under the BSD-3-Clause license. On 17 May 2010 the 1.x branch has also been released under the BSD-3-Clause license, though without source code.

== See also ==
- Midnight Commander
- Comparison of file managers
- ConEmu
- WinSCP plugin
