= B1 (file format) =

Open archive file format

- Filename extension: .b1
- Internet media type: application/x-b1
- Developed by: Catalina Group Ltd
- Initial release: 2011
- Type of format: Data compression

B1 is an open archive file format that supports data compression and archiving. B1 files use the file extension ".b1" or ".B1" and the MIME media type application/x-b1. B1 incorporates the LZMA compression algorithm. B1 archive combines a number of files and folders into one or more volumes, optionally adding compression and encryption. Construction of the B1 archive involves creating a binary stream of records and building volumes of that stream. The B1 archive format supports password-based AES-256 encryption. B1 files are created and opened with its native open-source B1 Pack Tool, as well as B1 Free Archiver utility.

== B1 Pack Project ==
B1 Pack is an open-source software project that produces a cross-platform command-line tool and a Java library for creating and extracting file archives in the B1 archive format. Source code of the project is published at GitHub. B1 Pack Project is released under the Apache License. The B1 Pack Tool module builds a single executable JAR file which can create, list, and extract B1 archive files from a command-line interface.

== B1 format features ==
- Support for Unicode names for files inside an archive.
- Archives and the files inside it can be of any size.
- Support for split archives, that consist of several parts.
- Integrity check with the Adler-32 algorithm.
- Data compression using the LZMA algorithm.
- Supports encryption with the AES algorithm.

== API features ==
- Instant creation of an archive without reading from/writing to a file system.
- Producing only a byte range of an archive, e.g. for resuming downloads.
- Streaming archive content without prior knowledge of all the files being packaged.
