= ShrinkIt =

ShrinkIt (named NuFX archive and file format)
- Filename extension: .SHK (regular NuFX archives), .SDK (NuFX disk images)
- Initial release: 1987?
- Latest release: 1.0.6 (GS), 3.4 (Apple II); GS: 30 April 1992; 34 years ago, A2: 24 January 1991; 35 years ago
- Type of format: Data compression
- Extended from: .BNY (Binary II envelope) .BQY (squeezed file in Binary II envelope) .BXY (NuFX in Binary II envelope)
- Extended to: .SDK NuFX disk image

A NuFX archive is an archive file format that supports lossless data compression. It is usually given the file extension SHK; SDK may also be used to specify that the archive describes the entire contents of a disk.

== History ==
Andy E. Nicholas designed the format as an improved replacement for the Binary II (.BNY) format, adding compression. He introduced it alongside a PKZIP-like program called ShrinkIt for Apple II systems, which he later migrated to the Apple IIGS as GS-Shrinkit.

The specification was republished by Apple in its File Type Notes.

== See also ==
- Comparison of file archivers
- Comparison of archive formats
- List of archive formats
- LZW
