= Lzip =

Data compression utility

lzip
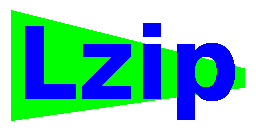
- Developer: Antonio Diaz Diaz
- Release: 2008; 18 years ago
- Stable release: 1.26 / March 17, 2026; 3 months ago
- Written in: C++ or C
- Operating system: Unix-like, Windows, Android
- Type: Data compression
- License: GPLv2+ (Free software)
- Website: www.nongnu.org/lzip/
- Repository: none

lzip
- Filename extension: .lz
- Internet media type: application/lzip
- Magic number: 0x4C, 0x5A, 0x49, 0x50
- Developed by: Antonio Diaz Diaz
- Type of format: Data compression
- Open format?: Yes

lzip is a free, command-line tool for the compression of data; it employs the Lempel–Ziv–Markov chain algorithm (LZMA) with a user interface that is familiar to users of usual Unix compression tools, such as gzip and bzip2.

Like gzip and bzip2, concatenation is supported to compress multiple files, but the convention is to bundle a file that is an archive itself, such as those created by the tar or cpio Unix programs. Lzip can split the output for the creation of multivolume archives.

The file that is produced by lzip is usually given .lz as its filename extension, and the data is described by the media type application/lzip.

The lzip suite of programs was written in C++ and C by Antonio Diaz Diaz and is being distributed as free software under the terms of version 2 or later of the GNU General Public License (GPL).

== History ==
7-Zip was released for Microsoft Windows in 2000; 7-Zip's LZMA algorithm first became available on Unix-like operating systems in 2004 when the command-line version of 7-Zip (p7zip) was ported. In the same year, the LZMA SDK became available, which included the lzma_alone program. Less than a year later, Lasse Collin released LZMA Utils, a set of wrapper scripts implementing a gzip-like interface to lzma_alone. In 2008 Antonio Diaz Diaz released lzip, which uses a container format with checksums and magic numbers instead of the raw LZMA data stream, providing a complete Unix-style solution for using LZMA. In 2009 LZMA Utils was renamed to XZ Utils and implemented its own xz container format with similar features.

== Features ==
=== File integrity ===
lzip is capable of creating archives with independently decompressible data sections called a "multimember archive" (as well as split output for the creation of multivolume archives). For example, if the underlying file is a tar archive, this can allow extracting any undamaged files, even if other parts of the archive are damaged.

As for the file format, special emphasis has been put on enabling integrity checks by means of an integrated 32-bit checksum for each compressed stream; this is used in combination with the lziprecover program to detect and reconstruct damaged data. This recovery tool can merge multiple copies of an archive where each copy may have damage in a different part of the file.

=== Parallelism ===
lzip has two parallel interfaces provided in the default distribution.

- plzip compresses any file in a parallel way. Using it with tar is insufficient, since the conventional tar program needs the entire stream before a file to locate it for decompression, resulting in non-parallel extraction.
- tarlz combines tar and lzip into a parallel archiver much like modern archivers like RAR or 7-Zip. The solid compression blocks align with tar file boundaries, so extracting a file only requires decompressing that particular member block.

== Adoption ==
=== Availability ===
In popular Linux distributions, lzip can usually be installed from official package repositories.

=== Support ===
- The GNU Autotools support lzip. Adding dist-lzip to AM_INIT_AUTOMAKE will build lzip-ed tarballs.
- Versions 1.23 and newer of GNU tar support using lzip to handle compressed files transparently.
- GNOME's archiving tool, Archive Manager, supports lzip files.

=== Application ===
- The Linux distribution Dragora GNU/Linux-Libre employs lzip for its software packages.
- Lzip is used to distribute the Time Zone Database from IANA, and the Linux-libre kernel.
- Lzip is used in NASA's Planetary Data System (PDS).

== See also ==
- Data recovery
- Lossless data compression
