= Pack (software) =

- Filename extension: .z
- Type of format: data compression

Pack is a legacy Unix shell compression program based on Huffman coding.

The unpack utility will restore files to their original state after they have been compressed using the pack utility. If no files are specified, the standard input will be uncompressed to the standard output.

Although obsolete, support for packed files exists in modern compression tools such as gzip and 7-zip.

== Description of program ==
Files compressed by pack are typically given the extension ".z" (not to be confused with the ".Z" of compress). Files can be returned to their original state using unpack. In addition, there may also be a pcat command which reads in a compressed file and sends its output to stdout.

== See also ==
- Data compression
- Image compression
- List of Unix commands
