= RAR (file format) =

Archive file format

RAR file format
- Filename extension: .rar, .rev, .r00, .r01
- Internet media type: application/vnd.rar
- Uniform Type Identifier (UTI): com.rarlab.rar-archive
- Magic number: 52 61 72 21 1A 07 00 (RAR 1.5 to 4.0); 52 61 72 21 1A 07 01 00 (RAR 5+)
- Size limitation: 2^{63}-1 bytes (almost 8 exbibytes)
- Developed by: Eugene Roshal
- Initial release: March 1993; 33 years ago
- Type of format: archive format
- Free format?: No (decompression source code publicly available, but not free software, with restriction that it "cannot be used to develop RAR (WinRAR) compatible archiver")
- Website: rarlab.com

RAR is a proprietary archive file format that supports data compression, error correction and file spanning. It was developed in 1993 by Russian software engineer Eugene Roshal and the software is licensed by win.rar GmbH. The name RAR stands for Roshal Archive.

== File format ==
The filename extensions used by RAR are .rar for the data volume set and .rev for the recovery volume set. Previous versions of RAR split large archives into several smaller files, creating a "multi-volume archive". Numbers were used in the file extensions of the smaller files to keep them in the proper sequence. The first file used the extension .rar, then .r00 for the second, and then .r01, .r02, etc.

RAR compression applications and libraries (including GUI based WinRAR application for Windows, console rar utility for different OSes and others) are proprietary software, to which Alexander L. Roshal, the elder brother of Eugene Roshal, holds the copyright. Version 3 of RAR is based on Lempel-Ziv (LZSS) and prediction by partial matching (PPM) compression, specifically the PPMd implementation of PPMII by Dmitry Shkarin.

The minimum size of a RAR file is 20 bytes. The maximum size of a RAR file is 9,223,372,036,854,775,807 (2^{63}−1) bytes, which is one byte less than 8 EiB.

=== Versions ===
The RAR file format revision history:

- 1.3 – the first public version.
- 1.4 – added packed archive comments and authenticity-verification information.
- 1.5 – a major format redesign intended to improve reliability and compatibility with different file systems and media. Introduces the signature 52 61 72 21 1A 07 00 (Rar!\x1A\x07\x00).
- 2.0 – released with WinRAR 2.0 and Rar for MS-DOS 2.0; features the following changes:
  - Multimedia compression for true color bitmap images and uncompressed audio.
  - Up to 1 MB compression dictionary.
  - Introduces archives data recovery protection record.
- 2.9 (Note: WinRAR 5.0 and RAR for Android refer to this format as RAR4.) – released in WinRAR version 3.00. Feature changes in this version include:
  - File extensions is changed from {volume name}.rar, {volume name}.r00, {volume name}.r01, etc. to {volume name}.part001.rar, {volume name}.part002.rar, etc.
  - Encryption of both file data and file headers.
  - Improves compression algorithm using 4 MB dictionary size, Dmitry Shkarin's PPMII algorithm for file data.
  - Optional creation of "recovery volumes" (.rev files) for error correction, which can be used to reconstruct missing files in a volume set.
  - Support for archive files larger than 9 GB.
  - Support for Unicode file names stored in UTF-16 little endian format.
- 5.0 – supported by WinRAR 5.0 (released April 2013) and later. Changes in this version:
  - Maximum compression dictionary size increased to 1 GB (default for WinRAR 5.x is 32 MB and 4 MB for WinRAR 4.x).
  - Maximum path length for files in RAR and ZIP archives is increased up to 2048 characters.
  - Support for Unicode file names stored in UTF-8 format.
  - Faster compression and decompression.
  - Multicore decompression support.
  - Greatly improves recovery.
  - Optional AES encryption increased from 128-bit to 256-bit.
  - Optional 256-bit BLAKE2 file hash instead of a default 32-bit CRC-32 file checksum.
  - Optional duplicate file detection.
  - Optional NTFS hard and symbolic links.
  - Optional Quick Open Record. Rar4 archives had to be parsed before opening as file names were spread throughout the archive, slowing operation particularly with slower devices such as optical drives, and reducing the integrity of damaged archives. Rar5 can optionally create a "quick open record", a special archive block at the end of the file that contains the names of files included, allowing archives to be opened faster.
  - Removes specialized compression algorithms for Itanium executables, text, raw audio (WAV), and raw image (BMP) files; consequently some files of these types compress better in the older RAR (4) format with these options enabled than in RAR5.
- 5.0+ – partially supported by WinRAR 5.0 and later. Fully supported by WinRAR 7.0 (released February 2024) and later. Changes in this version:
  - Compression dictionary up to 64 GB.
  - Improved compression by the addition of "Alternate search algorithm".
  - Maximum path length limit increased from 2047 to 65535 characters.

== Software ==
=== Native operating system support ===
RARlab's native software is available for Microsoft Windows (named WinRAR), Linux, FreeBSD, macOS, and Android; archive extraction is supported natively in ChromeOS. WinRAR and RAR for Android feature the graphical user interface (GUI); other versions named RAR run as console commands.

=== Creating RAR files ===
RAR files can only be created with proprietary WinRAR (Windows), RAR for Android, command-line RAR (available for Windows, macOS, Linux, and FreeBSD), and other software that has written permission from Alexander Roshal or uses copyrighted code under license from Roshal. The software license agreements forbid reverse engineering.

=== Third-party software for extracting RAR files ===
Several programs can unpack the file format.

- RARLAB distributes the C++ source code and binaries for a command-line unrar program. The license permits its use to produce software capable of unpacking, but not creating, RAR archives, without having to pay a fee. It is not a free software license.
- 7-Zip, a free and open-source program, starting from 7-Zip version 15.06 beta can unpack RAR5 archives, using the RARLAB unrar code.
- PeaZip is a free RAR unarchiver, licensed under the LGPLv3-or-later and via 7-Zip can unpack RAR archives, using RARLAB unrar.
- The Unarchiver is a proprietary freeware software unarchiver for Mac for RAR and other formats. It was previously free software licensed under the LGPLv2.1-or-later, up to version 3.11.1 (released 2016), which at the time provided a free-software implementation of extraction of RAR versions up to RAR5. There is a free software (LGPLv2.1-or-later) command-line version, unar, forked from 2016, which runs on Mac, Windows, and Linux.
- UNRARLIB (UniquE RAR File Library) was an obsolete free software unarchiving library called "unrarlib", licensed under the GPLv2-or-later. It could only decompress archives created by RAR versions prior to 2.9; archives created by RAR 2.9 and later use different formats not supported by this library. The original development-team ended work on this library in 2007.
- libarchive, a free and open-source library for reading and writing a variety of archive formats, with partial support for all RAR versions, including RAR5. The code was written from scratch using RAR's “technote.txt” format description.
- Windows 11 natively supports RAR extraction since version 23H2 using the libarchive open-source project.

== Other uses of rar ==
The filename extension rar is also used by the unrelated Resource Adapter aRchive file format.

== See also ==
- .cbr
- List of archive formats
- Comparison of archive formats
- Comparison of file archivers
- Data corruption, Bit rot, Disc rot
