= The Three University Missions Ranking =

Global ranking of universities

- Editor: Dmitry Grishankov
- Categories: Higher education
- Frequency: Annual
- Publisher: Association of Rating Makers
- First issue: 2017
- Country: Russia
- Language: English, Russian
- Website: www.mosiur.org

The Three University Missions Moscow International University Ranking (MosIUR, also referred to as the Moscow Ranking) is a global ranking of academic universities developed by the Russian Association of Rating Makers, with the participation of the international association IREG Observatory on Academic Ranking and Excellence. The ranking evaluates the quality of education and scientific work, and for the very first time in international practice, a university's contribution to society, as well — a criterion, rarely assessed by other academic rankings. Another unique feature of the ranking is the consideration of the “Number of alumni with an individual article about them on Wikipedia”.

The ranking is published annually since 2017.

== History ==
Plans were first announced in 2016 in Russia for the development of a new international ranking that would evaluate not only the quality of education and research, but also the level of international cooperation as well as the contribution to sustainable development and distance learning. The non-profit Association of Rating Makers, established by RAEX International Group and leading Russian rating agencies and ranking compilers, acts as the ranking’s operator.

The pilot version of the ranking was published in December 2017. It included 200 universities from 39 countries.

The second issue of the ranking, published in November 2018, included 333 universities from 53 countries. The 2019 table included more than 1200 universities; in 2020, the number has risen to 1500 universities from 97 countries and territories. In 2021, there were 1,650 higher education institutions represented in the ranking. In 2022 the list has been expanded up to 1,800 universities and in 2023 - up to 2000.

In 2022, the latest ranking issue served as a basis for the creation of the “Three University Missions” Ecosystem, which incorporates following ranking projects: MosIUR (global ranking of academic universities), RAEX-100 (top 100 Russian universities), Subject Rankings of Russian universities (in 35 subject areas), Local Rankings (universities from each of the 8 Russian Federal Districts) and Special Rankings (devoted to specific aspects of universities activities, such as influence, media activity etc).

In November 2022, the decision has been made to establish a joint Working Group on the development and implementation of the “Three University Missions” Ecosystem between Russian Union of Rectors (RUR) and Russian Academy of Sciences (RAS). It is planned for the Russian Academy of Education (RAE) to join the Working Group later on, as well.

== Methodology ==
=== Methodology development ===
The ranking methodology was developed in collaboration with more than 100 organizations: universities, councils of rectors, rating agencies and expert associations, notably the IREG Observatory on Academic Rankings and Excellence and the Russian Union of Rectors. The Expert Council of the ranking comprises experts in the field of higher education from 25 countries, such as the Belgium, Brazil, China, India, Iran, Italy, Poland, South Africa, Turkey, USA, UK, and Russia.

=== Indicators ===
According to the current version of the methodology (2023), the ranking uses 16 indicators divided into three groups: Education, Research, and University & Society. The total weight of indicators per group is 45% (Education), 25% (Research) and 30% (University & Society).

"Education" group indicators

1. Number of student wins in international student contests.

2. Percentage of international students.

3. University budget to student ratio.

4. Student to academic staff ratio.

"Research" group indicators

5. IREG List awards won by university academic staff and alumni

6. Average normalised citation impact (global level)

7. Average normalised citation impact (national level)

8. Research income per academic staff member

"University and Society" group indicators

9. Number of Massive Open Online Courses (MOOCs)

10. Share of the university in total national publications

11. Total pages of a university's website indexed by the leading search engines

12. Views of the university's page on Wikipedia

13. University's followers in social media

14. Number of alumni with an individual article about them on Wikipedia

15. University website reach

16. Transparency

=== International audit ===
In May 2018, the ranking received a report on its audit by PricewaterhouseCoopers (PwC). The “Three University Missions” ranking thus became the second global academic ranking, after Times Higher Education (THE), that has passed this procedure.

== Rankings ==
The 2017 pilot ranking comprised 200 universities from 39 countries, including 13 Russian universities. The most widely represented nations in the ranking were universities in the United States, the UK, and China, with 41, 18, and 14 universities in the top 200, respectively.

The 2018 ranking represented 333 universities from 53 countries, including 17 Russian universities. In the top 333 of the ranking’s second issue were 61 universities from the USA, followed by 29 British and 25 German universities.

The 2019 ranking table featured 1,200 universities from 79 countries.

The fourth issue (2020) listed 1,500 higher education institutions from 97 countries. The US, China and Russia were the most represented countries with 200, 122, and 101 institutions in the ranking, respectively.

The fifth issue included 1,650 higher education institutions from 97 countries and territories.

The sixth edition of MosIUR (2022) included a record high of 1,800 universities from 103 countries. Russia was represented by 146 universities. Lomonosov Moscow State University, Saint-Petersburg State University and Moscow Institute of Physics and Technology were among 50 world best universities.

In 2023 the Three University Missions Ranking included 2000 universities from 112 countries. Russia along with the USA and China preserved its top-3 leadership in representation status. Meanwhile in 2023, for the first time in this ranking history, Asia surpassed Europe in number of participants in the list of world best universities.

Moscow International universities'rating «The Three University Missions», 2025 - Top-20

| Rank | Name | Country |
|---|---|---|
| 1 | Massachusetts Institute of Technology | USA |
| 2 | Harvard University | USA |
| 3 | University of Oxford | Great Britain |
| 4 | University of Cambridge | Great Britain |
| 5 | Stanford University | USA |
| 6 | University College London | Great Britain |
| 7 | Imperial College London | Great Britain |
| 8 | Columbia University | USA |
| 9 | ETH Zurich – Swiss Federal Institute of Technology Zurich | Switzerland |
| 10 | University of Tokyo | Japan |
| 11 | Johns Hopkins University | USA |
| 12 | Duke University | USA |
| 13 | University of Edinburgh | Great Britain |
| 14 | University of Chicago | USA |
| 15 | New York University | USA |
| 16 | Yale University | USA |
| 17 | Lomonosov Moscow State University | Russia |
| 18 | University of Pennsylvania | USA |
| 19 | École polytechnique fédérale de Lausanne (EPFL) | Switzerland |
| 20 | University of Michigan | USA |

Leading Russian universities in Moscow International universities'rating «The Three University Missions», 2025

| Rank (Country list) | Name | Rank (Global list) |
|---|---|---|
| 1 | Lomonosov Moscow State University | 17 |
| 2 | Saint Petersburg State University | 47 |
| 3 | Moscow Institute of Physics and Technology | 59 |
| 4 | National Research University Higher School of Economics (HSE) | 137 |
| 5 | National Research Nuclear University MEPhI | 174 |
| 6 | Novosibirsk State University | 238 |
| 7 | Tomsk State University | 269 |
| 8 | RUDN University | 284 |
| 9 | Bauman Moscow State Technical University | 290 |
| 10-12 | Moscow State Institute of International Relations | 301-350 |
| 10-12 | MISIS University | 301-350 |
| 10-12 | Ural Federal University | 301-350 |
| 13-15 | Sechenov University | 351-400 |
| 13-15 | Russian Presidential Academy of National Economy and Public Administration (RANEPA) | 351-400 |
| 13-15 | ITMO University | 351-400 |
| 16-17 | Tomsk Polytechnic University | 401-450 |
| 16-17 | Peter the Great St. Petersburg Polytechnic University | 401-450 |
| 18-19 | Pavlov First St. Petersburg State Medical University | 451-500 |
| 18-19 | Pirogov Russian National Research Medical University | 451-500 |
| 20-21 | Kazan Federal University | 501-550 |
| 20-21 | Innopolis University | 501-550 |
| 22-23 | Moscow Aviation Institute (National Research University) | 651-700 |
| 22-23 | Financial University under the Government of the Russian Federation | 651-700 |

== Reaction ==
The ranking attracted the interest of a number of representatives of the rating community and researchers, who particularly noted the innovativeness of the ranking in terms of its assessment of the “third mission” (interaction between university and society).

According to the president of the Perspektywy education foundation, Waldemar Siwinski, the ranking "goes beyond traditional ranking criteria, adding some new, more socially oriented elements".

In an interview with the Brazilian publication Folha de S. Paulo, the president of the international association IREG Observatory on Academic Rankings and Excellence, Luiz Claudio Costa, noted that “the new Moscow International University Ranking represents the second generation of academic rankings and <...> poses correct and important questions by its search for indicators to evaluate the quality of teaching and the interaction of the university with society”.

The president of the Council for Higher Education Accreditation (CHEA, USA), Judith Eaton, called the release of the ranking timely, in view of the growing recognition that the social role of a university is one of its key functions. She views the ranking as an attempt to move away from the elitist approach of evaluating universities, instead paying special attention to the social responsibility of higher education.

An expert on academic rankings from the University of Groningen (The Netherlands), Jules van Rooij, criticized the ranking, noting that, despite a number of "good ideas," "[the compilers] of the ranking measure only what they want to measure" and "quality can't be assessed with simple linear lists".

Jack Grove, columnist for World University Rankings, was also skeptical about the ranking, noting that the exceptional achievements of Russian universities in the ranking had Russian roots.

The ranking was discussed in a number of academic studies along with the leading global university rankings – Times Higher Education, QS, ARWU, etc. An article by Ivančević & Luković (2018) points out that the Moscow International University Ranking is the only global academic ranking considered in their study that covers all “performance dimensions.” Zadorozhnyuk et al. (2018) noted the innovative use of the “University and Society” group criteria in the ranking. The ideas of the rating are displayed in some researchers' works. In addition to “The Three University Missions” ranking, the assessment of the university's contribution to society is also used by the Washington Monthly College Rankings and THE Impact Rankings.

== Links ==
- The Three University Missions Ranking Methodology (November 2018).
- Methodology. Audit report.
