= Eugene Roshal =

Russian software engineer (born 1972)

- Born: 10 March 1972 (age 54); Chelyabinsk, Russian SFSR, Soviet Union
- Education: South Ural State University (former Chelyabinsk State Technical University), Faculty of Electronics
- Occupation: Computer programmer
- Known for: RAR, WinRAR

Eugene Roshal (Russian: Евгений Лазаревич Рошал, romanized: Yevgeniy Lazarevich Roshal; born 1972) is a Russian software engineer best known for developing the RAR file format, the WinRAR archiver, and a file management utility called Far Manager. His contributions have significantly impacted the field of data compression and file management.

== Biography ==
=== Development of RAR and WinRAR ===
In 1993, Roshal developed the RAR (Roshal Archive) file format, designed to offer higher compression ratios compared to existing formats like ZIP. Two years later, in 1995, he released WinRAR, a graphical file archiver utility for Windows that utilizes the RAR format. WinRAR quickly gained popularity due to its efficiency, user-friendly interface, and robust feature set, including support for multiple languages, encryption, and archive repair capabilities.

=== Far Manager ===
In 1996, Roshal introduced the FAR (File and Archive Manager) file manager, a text-based file management tool for Windows. FAR is appreciated by developers and power users for its flexibility, plugin support, and efficient handling of files and directories.

=== Ownership and copyright ===
While Eugene Roshal created the RAR compression algorithm, the copyright has been held by his older brother, Alexander Roshal. This arrangement has allowed Eugene to concentrate on software development without being encumbered by copyright and licensing issues.

=== Contributions ===
- RAR file format (1993): A proprietary archive file format that supports data compression, error recovery, and file spanning.
- WinRAR file archiver (1995): A widely used file archiver that provides a graphical interface for managing RAR and ZIP archives, among others. It is known for its high compression ratios and extensive feature set.
- Far Manager (1996): A versatile file management tool that offers a text-based interface with support for plugins, making it highly customizable and efficient for advanced users.
