= LZMA =

Lossless compression algorithm

LZMA (Lempel–Ziv–Markov chain algorithm) is a lossless data compression algorithm developed since 1998 by Igor Pavlov, the developer of 7-Zip. It has been used in the 7z format of the 7-Zip archiver since 2001. This algorithm uses a dictionary compression scheme somewhat similar to the LZ77 algorithm published by Abraham Lempel and Jacob Ziv in 1977 and features a high compression ratio (generally higher than bzip2) and a variable compression-dictionary size (up to 4 GB), while still maintaining decompression speed similar to other commonly used compression algorithms.

LZMA2 is a simple container format that allows multi-threaded compression and decompression using multiple separate LZMA streams. It is used in both in the 7z and the xz format.

== Overview ==
LZMA uses a dictionary compression algorithm (a variant of LZ77 with huge dictionary sizes and special support for repeatedly used match distances), whose output is then encoded with a range encoder, using a complex model to make a probability prediction of each bit. The dictionary compressor finds matches using sophisticated dictionary data structures, and produces a stream of literal symbols and phrase references, which is encoded one bit at a time by the range encoder: many encodings are possible, and a dynamic programming algorithm is used to select an optimal one under certain approximations.

Prior to LZMA, most encoder models were purely byte-based (i.e. they coded each bit using only a cascade of contexts to represent the dependencies on previous bits from the same byte). The main innovation of LZMA is that instead of a generic byte-based model, LZMA's model uses contexts specific to the bitfields in each representation of a literal or phrase: this is nearly as simple as a generic byte-based model, but gives much better compression because it avoids mixing unrelated bits together in the same context. Furthermore, compared to classic dictionary compression (such as the one used in zip and gzip formats), the dictionary sizes can be and usually are much larger, taking advantage of the large amount of memory available on modern systems.

== Compressed format overview ==
In LZMA compression, the compressed stream is a stream of bits, encoded using an adaptive binary range coder. The stream is divided into packets, each packet describing either a single byte, or an LZ77 sequence with its length and distance implicitly or explicitly encoded. Each part of each packet is modelled with independent contexts, so the probability predictions for each bit are correlated with the values of that bit (and related bits from the same field) in previous packets of the same type. Both the lzip and the LZMA SDK documentation describe this stream format.

There are 7 types of packets:

Packed code (bit sequence)	Packet name	Packet description
0 + byteCode	LIT	A single byte encoded using an adaptive binary range coder.
1+0 + len + dist	MATCH	A typical LZ77 sequence describing sequence length and distance.
1+1+0+0	SHORTREP	A one-byte LZ77 sequence. Distance is equal to the last used LZ77 distance.
1+1+0+1 + len	LONGREP[0]	An LZ77 sequence. Distance is equal to the last used LZ77 distance.
1+1+1+0 + len	LONGREP[1]	An LZ77 sequence. Distance is equal to the second last used LZ77 distance.
1+1+1+1+0 + len	LONGREP[2]	An LZ77 sequence. Distance is equal to the third last used LZ77 distance.
1+1+1+1+1 + len	LONGREP[3]	An LZ77 sequence. Distance is equal to the fourth last used LZ77 distance.

LONGREP[*] refers to LONGREP[0–3] packets, *REP refers to both LONGREP and SHORTREP, and *MATCH refers to both MATCH and *REP.

LONGREP[n] packets remove the distance used from the list of the most recent distances and reinsert it at the front, to avoid useless repeated entry, while MATCH just adds the distance to the front even if already present in the list and SHORTREP and LONGREP[0] don't alter the list.

The length is encoded as follows:

Length code (bit sequence)	Description
0+ 3 bits	The length encoded using 3 bits, gives the lengths range from 2 to 9.
1+0+ 3 bits	The length encoded using 3 bits, gives the lengths range from 10 to 17.
1+1+ 8 bits	The length encoded using 8 bits, gives the lengths range from 18 to 273.

As in LZ77, the length is not limited by the distance, because copying from the dictionary is defined as if the copy was performed byte by byte, keeping the distance constant.

Distances are logically 32-bit and distance 0 points to the most recently added byte in the dictionary.

The distance encoding starts with a 6-bit "distance slot", which determines how many further bits are needed. Distances are decoded as a binary concatenation of, from most to least significant, two bits depending on the distance slot, some bits encoded with fixed 0.5 probability, and some context encoded bits, according to the following table (distance slots 0−3 directly encode distances 0−3).

Distance encoding
6-bit distance slot	Highest 2 bits	Fixed 0.5 probability bits	Context encoded bits
0	00	0	0
1	01	0	0
2	10	0	0
3	11	0	0
4	10	0	1
5	11	0	1
6	10	0	2
7	11	0	2
8	10	0	3
9	11	0	3
10	10	0	4
11	11	0	4
12	10	0	5
13	11	0	5
14–62 (even)	10	slot / 2 − 5	4
15–63 (odd)	11	(slot − 1) / 2 − 5	4

== Decompression algorithm details ==
No complete natural language specification of the compressed format seems to exist, other than the one attempted in the following text.

The description below is based on the compact XZ Embedded decoder by Lasse Collin included in the Linux kernel source from which the LZMA and LZMA2 algorithm details can be relatively easily deduced: thus, while citing source code as reference is not ideal, any programmer should be able to check the claims below with a few hours of work.

=== Range coding of bits ===
LZMA data is at the lowest level decoded one bit at a time by the range decoder, at the direction of the LZMA decoder.

Context-based range decoding is invoked by the LZMA algorithm passing it a reference to the "context", which consists of the unsigned 11-bit variable prob (typically implemented using a 16-bit data type) representing the predicted probability of the bit being 0, which is read and updated by the range decoder (and should be initialized to $2^{10}$, representing 0.5 probability).

Fixed probability range decoding instead assumes a 0.5 probability, but operates slightly differently from context-based range decoding.

The range decoder state consists of two unsigned 32-bit variables, range (representing the range size), and code (representing the encoded point within the range).

Initialization of the range decoder consists of setting range to 2^{32} − 1, and code to the 32-bit value starting at the second byte in the stream interpreted as big-endian; the first byte in the stream is completely ignored.

Normalization proceeds in this way:

1. Shift both range and code left by 8 bits
2. Read a byte from the compressed stream
3. Set the least significant 8 bits of code to the byte value read

Context-based range decoding of a bit using the prob probability variable proceeds in this way:

1. If range is less than $2^{24}$, perform normalization
2. Set bound to $\lfloor range / 2^{11} \rfloor \times prob$
3. If code is less than bound:
  1. Set range to bound
  2. Set prob to prob + $\lfloor 2^{11} - prob \rfloor / 2^5$
  3. Return bit 0
4. Otherwise (if code is greater than or equal to the bound):
  1. Set range to range − bound
  2. Set code to code − bound
  3. Set prob to $prob - \lfloor prob / 2^5 \rfloor$
  4. Return bit 1

Fixed-probability range decoding of a bit proceeds in this way:

1. If range is less than $2^{24}$, perform normalization
2. Set range to $\lfloor range / 2 \rfloor$
3. If code is less than range:
  1. Return bit 0
4. Otherwise (if code is greater or equal than range):
  1. Set code to code − range
  2. Return bit 1

The Linux kernel implementation of fixed-probability decoding in rc_direct(), for performance reasons, does not include a conditional branch, but instead subtracts range from code unconditionally. The resulting sign bit is used to both decide the bit to return and to generate a mask that is combined with code and added to range.

Note that:

1. The division by $2^{11}$ when computing bound and floor operation is done before the multiplication, not after (apparently to avoid requiring fast hardware support for 32-bit multiplication with a 64-bit result)
2. Fixed probability decoding is not strictly equivalent to context-based range decoding with any prob value, due to the fact that context-based range decoding discards the lower 11 bits of range before multiplying by prob as just described, while fixed probability decoding only discards the last bit

=== Range coding of integers ===
The range decoder also provides the bit-tree, reverse bit-tree and fixed probability integer decoding facilities, which are used to decode integers, and generalize the single-bit decoding described above. To decode unsigned integers less than limit, an array of (limit − 1) 11-bit probability variables is provided, which are conceptually arranged as the internal nodes of a complete binary tree with limit leaves.

Non-reverse bit-tree decoding works by keeping a pointer to the tree of variables, which starts at the root. As long as the pointer does not point to a leaf, a bit is decoded using the variable indicated by the pointer, and the pointer is moved to either the left or right children depending on whether the bit is 0 or 1; when the pointer points to a leaf, the number associated with the leaf is returned.

Non-reverse bit-tree decoding thus happens from most significant to least significant bit, stopping when only one value in the valid range is possible (this conceptually allows to have range sizes that are not powers of two, even though LZMA does not make use of this).

Reverse bit-tree decoding instead decodes from least significant bit to most significant bits, and thus only supports ranges that are powers of two, and always decodes the same number of bits. It is equivalent to performing non-reverse bittree decoding with a power of two limit, and reversing the last log_{2}(limit) bits of the result.

In the rc_bittree function in the Linux kernel, integers are actually returned in the [limit, 2 × limit) range (with limit added to the conceptual value), and the variable at index 0 in the array is unused, while the one at index 1 is the root, and the left and right children indices are computed as 2i and 2i + 1. The rc_bittree_reverse function instead adds integers in the [0, limit) range to a caller-provided variable, where limit is implicitly represented by its logarithm, and has its own independent implementation for efficiency reasons.

Fixed probability integer decoding simply performs fixed probability bit decoding repeatedly, reading bits from the most to the least significant.

=== LZMA configuration ===
The LZMA decoder is configured by an lclppb "properties" byte and a dictionary size. The value of the lclppb byte is lc + lp * 9 + pb * 9 * 5, where:

- lc is the number of high bits of the previous byte to use as a context for literal encoding (the default value used by the LZMA SDK is 3)
- lp is the number of low bits of the dictionary position to include in literal_pos_state (the default value used by the LZMA SDK is 0)
- pb is the number of low bits of the dictionary position to include in pos_state (the default value used by the LZMA SDK is 2)

In non-LZMA2 streams, lc must not be greater than 8, and lp and pb must not be greater than 4; this results in a range of 0 to 224. In LZMA2 streams, lc + lp and pb must not be greater than 4; this provides a much larger set of impossible values.

In the 7-zip LZMA file format, configuration is performed by a header containing the "properties" byte followed by the 32-bit little-endian dictionary size in bytes. In LZMA2, the properties byte can optionally be changed at the start of LZMA2 LZMA packets, while the dictionary size is specified in the LZMA2 header as later described.

=== LZMA coding contexts ===
The LZMA packet format has already been described, and this section specifies how LZMA statistically models the LZ-encoded streams, or in other words which probability variables are passed to the range decoder to decode each bit.

Those probability variables are implemented as multi-dimensional arrays; before introducing them, a few values that are used as indices in these multidimensional arrays are defined.

The state value is conceptually based on which of the patterns in the following table match the latest 2–4 packet types seen, and is implemented as a state machine state updated according to the transition table listed in the table every time a packet is output.

The initial state is 0, and thus packets before the beginning are assumed to be LIT packets.

state	previous packets				next state when next packet is			
	4th previous	3rd previous	2nd previous	previous	LIT	MATCH	LONGREP[*]	SHORTREP
0		LIT	LIT	LIT	0	7	8	9
1		MATCH	LIT	LIT	0	7	8	9
2		LONGREP[*]	LIT	LIT	0	7	8	9
2	*MATCH	SHORTREP	LIT	LIT	0	7	8	9
3	LIT	SHORTREP	LIT	LIT	0	7	8	9
4			MATCH	LIT	1	7	8	9
5			LONGREP[*]	LIT	2	7	8	9
5		*MATCH	SHORTREP	LIT	2	7	8	9
6		LIT	SHORTREP	LIT	3	7	8	9
7			LIT	MATCH	4	10	11	11
8			LIT	LONGREP[*]	5	10	11	11
9			LIT	SHORTREP	6	10	11	11
10			*MATCH	MATCH	4	10	11	11
11			*MATCH	*REP	5	10	11	11

The pos_state and literal_pos_state values consist of respectively the pb and lp (up to 4, from the LZMA header or LZMA2 properties packet) least significant bits of the dictionary position (the number of bytes coded since the last dictionary reset modulo the dictionary size). Note that the dictionary size is normally the multiple of a large power of 2, so these values are equivalently described as the least significant bits of the number of uncompressed bytes seen since the last dictionary reset.

The prev_byte_lc_msbs value is set to the lc (up to 4, from the LZMA header or LZMA2 properties packet) most significant bits of the previous uncompressed byte.

The is_REP value denotes whether a packet that includes a length is a LONGREP rather than a MATCH.

The match_byte value is the byte that would have been decoded if a SHORTREP packet had been used (in other words, the byte found at the dictionary at the last used distance); it is only used just after a *MATCH packet.

literal_bit_mode is an array of 8 values in the 0–2 range, one for each bit position in a byte, which are 1 or 2 if the previous packet was a *MATCH and it is either the most significant bit position or all the more significant bits in the literal to encode/decode are equal to the bits in the corresponding positions in match_byte, while otherwise it is 0; the choice between the 1 or 2 values depends on the value of the bit at the same position in match_byte.

The literal/Literal set of variables can be seen as a "pseudo-bit-tree" similar to a bit-tree but with 3 variables instead of 1 in every node, chosen depending on the literal_bit_mode value at the bit position of the next bit to decode after the bit-tree context denoted by the node.

The claim, found in some sources, that literals after a *MATCH are coded as the XOR of the byte value with match_byte is incorrect; they are instead coded simply as their byte value, but using the pseudo-bit-tree just described and the additional context listed in the table below.

The probability variable groups used in LZMA are those:

XZ name	LZMA SDK name	Parameterized by	Used when	Coding mode	If bit 0 then	If bit 1 then
is_match	IsMatch	state, pos_state	packet start	bit	LIT	*MATCH
is_rep	IsRep	state	after bit sequence 1	bit	MATCH	*REP
is_rep0	IsRepG0	state	after bit sequence 11	bit	SHORTREP/LONGREP[0]	LONGREP[1–3]
is_rep0_long	IsRep0Long	state, pos_state	after bit sequence 110	bit	SHORTREP	LONGREP[0]
is_rep1	IsRepG1	state	after bit sequence 111	bit	LONGREP[1]	LONGREP[2/3]
is_rep2	IsRepG2	state	after bit sequence 1111	bit	LONGREP[2]	LONGREP[3]
literal	Literal	prev_byte_lc_msbs, literal_pos_state, literal_bit_mode[bit position], bit-tree context	after bit sequence 0	256 values pseudo-bit-tree	literal byte value	
dist_slot	PosSlot	min(match_length, 5), bit-tree context	distance: start	64 values bit-tree	distance slot	
dist_special	SpecPos	distance_slot, reverse bit-tree context	distance: 4–13 distance slots	((distance_slot >> 1) − 1)-bit reverse bit-tree	low bits of distance	
dist_align	Align	reverse bit-tree context	distance: 14+ distance slots, after fixed probability bits	4-bit reverse bit-tree	low bits of distance	
len_dec.choice	LenChoice	is_REP	match length: start	bit	2–9 length	10+ length
len_dec.choice2	LenChoice2	is_REP	match length: after bit sequence 1	bit	10–17 length	18+ length
len_dec.low	LenLow	is_REP, pos_state, bit-tree context	match length: after bit sequence 0	8 values bit-tree	low bits of length	
len_dec.mid	LenMid	is_REP, pos_state, bit-tree context	match length: after bit sequence 10	8 values bit-tree	middle bits of length	
len_dec.high	LenHigh	is_REP, bit-tree context	match length: after bit sequence 11	256 values bit-tree	high bits of length	

=== LZMA2 format ===
The LZMA2 container supports multiple runs of compressed LZMA data and uncompressed data. Each LZMA compressed run can have a different LZMA configuration and dictionary. This improves the compression of partially or completely incompressible files and allows multithreaded compression and multithreaded decompression by breaking the file into runs that can be compressed or decompressed independently in parallel.

The LZMA2 header consists of a byte indicating the dictionary size:

- 40 indicates a 4 GB − 1 dictionary size
- Even values less than 40 indicate a 2^{v/2 + 12} bytes dictionary size
- Odd values less than 40 indicate a 3×2^{(v − 1)/2 + 11} bytes dictionary size
- Values higher than 40 are invalid

LZMA2 data consists of packets starting with a control byte, with the following values:

- 0 denotes the end of the file
- 1 denotes a dictionary reset followed by an uncompressed chunk
- 2 denotes an uncompressed chunk without a dictionary reset
- 3–0x7f are invalid values
- 0x80–0xff denotes an LZMA chunk, where the lowest 5 bits are used as bit 16–20 of the uncompressed size minus one, and bit 5–6 indicates what should be reset

Bits 5–6 for LZMA chunks can be:

- 0: nothing reset
- 1: state reset
- 2: state reset, properties reset using properties byte
- 3: state reset, properties reset using properties byte, dictionary reset

LZMA state resets cause a reset of all LZMA state except the dictionary, and specifically:

- The range coder
- The state value
- The last distances for repeated matches
- All LZMA probabilities

Uncompressed chunks consist of:

- A 16-bit big-endian value encoding the data size minus one
- The data to be copied verbatim into the dictionary and the output

LZMA chunks consist of:

- A 16-bit big-endian value encoding the low 16 bits of the uncompressed size minus one
- A 16-bit big-endian value encoding the compressed size minus one
- A properties/lclppb byte if bit 6 in the control byte is set
- The LZMA compressed data, starting with the 5 bytes (of which the first is ignored) used to initialize the range coder (which are included in the compressed size)

=== xz and 7z formats ===
The .xz format, which can contain LZMA2 data, is documented at tukaani.org, while the .7z file format, which can contain either LZMA or LZMA2 data, is documented in the 7zformat.txt file contained in the LZMA SDK.

== 7-Zip reference implementation ==
The LZMA implementation extracted from 7-Zip is available as LZMA SDK. It was originally dual-licensed under both the GNU LGPL and Common Public License, with an additional special exception for linked binaries, but was placed by Igor Pavlov in the public domain on December 2, 2008, with the release of version 4.62.

LZMA2 compression, which is an improved version of LZMA, is now the default compression method for the .7z format, starting with version 9.30 on October 26, 2012.

The reference open source LZMA compression library was originally written in C++ but has been ported to ANSI C, C#, and Java. There are also third-party Python bindings for the C++ library, as well as ports of LZMA to Pascal, Go and Ada.

The 7-Zip implementation uses several variants of hash chains, binary trees and Patricia trees as the basis for its dictionary search algorithm.

In addition to LZMA, the SDK and 7-Zip also implements multiple preprocessing filters intended to improve compression, ranging from simple delta encoding (for images) and BCJ for executable code. It also provides some other compression algorithms used in 7z.

Decompression-only code for LZMA generally compiles to around 5 KB, and the amount of RAM required during decompression is principally determined by the size of the sliding window used during compression. Small code size and relatively low memory overhead, particularly with smaller dictionary lengths, and free source code make the LZMA decompression algorithm well-suited to embedded applications.

== Other implementations ==
In addition to the 7-Zip reference implementation, the following support the LZMA format.

- xz: a streaming implementation that contains a gzip-like command line tool supporting LZMA2 in its xz file format. It made its way into several software of the Unix-like world with its high performance (compared to bzip2) and small size (compared to gzip). The Linux kernel, dpkg and RPM systems contains xz code, and many software distributors like kernel.org, Debian and Fedora now use xz for compressing their releases.
- lzip: another LZMA implementation mostly for Unix-like systems that is an alternative to xz. It features a simpler file format with easier error recovery.
- ZIPX: an extension to the ZIP compression format that was created by WinZip starting with version 12.1. It also can use various other compression methods such as BZip and PPMd.
