= Archive file =

File containing files with their metadata

An archive file stores the content of one or more computer files, possibly compressed and/or encrypted, with associated metadata such as file name, directory structure, error detection and correction information, and commentary. An archive file is often used to facilitate portability, distribution and backup, and to reduce storage use. An archive file is usually generated and modified via a file archiver utility.

== Applications ==
=== Portability ===
As an archive file stores file system information, including file content and metadata, it can be leveraged for file system content portability across heterogeneous systems. For example, a directory tree can be sent via email, files with unsupported names on the target system can be renamed during extraction, timestamps can be retained rather than lost during data transmission. Also, transfer of a single archive file may be faster than processing multiple files due to per-file overhead, and even faster if compressed.

=== Software distribution ===
Beyond archiving, archive files are often used for software distribution. When used in connection with a package manager, an archive must conform to a package format and is called a package. In particular, the format usually requires a manifest file. Examples include deb for Debian, JAR for Java, APK for Android, and self-extracting Windows Installer executables.

== Features ==
Notable features supported for various archives include:

- Concatenate multiple files in a single file
- Store file metadata as data, including file name, timestamps, permissions, source storage, notes and description
- Compression
- Encryption
- Error detection via checksums
- Error correction code to fix errors
- Splitting a large file into multiple, smaller files
- File patches/updates (when recording changes since a previous archive)
- Self-extraction
- Self-installation

=== Error detection and recovery ===
Archive files often include parity checks and other checksums for error detection, for instance zip files use a cyclic redundancy check (CRC). RAR archives may include additional error correction data (called recovery records).

Archive files that do not natively support recovery records can use separate parchive (PAR) files that allows for additional error correction and recovery of missing files in a multi-file archive.

=== File spanning ===
File spanning is the ability to package a single file or data stream into separate files of a specified size. This task implies the ability to re-combine the package files back into the original file or data stream. This is useful when saving large files onto smaller volumes or breaking large files up into smaller files for network messages of limited size (email, newsgroups). It also allows the creation of parity files such as parchive (PAR) to verify and restore missing or corrupted package files. Another advantage with this is coping with file size limits on some file systems of removable media, or coping with volume size limits of things like floppy disks. Sometimes the file spanning process is hidden as a secondary operation such as with file archivers. In this case, many smaller files are first packaged into a data stream and then repackaged into a multi-file archive.

Many file spanning utilities are available for nearly every OS and platform. Below are a few examples:

- PKZIP/WinZip
- RAR/WinRAR
- PAR/Parchive
- split (Unix)

== Format ==
Some archive file formats are well-defined and some have become conventions supported by multiple vendors and communities. As is common for all files, the format of an archive is generally indicated by file name extension and/or file header.

Commonly used formats include zip, rar, 7z, and tar. Java introduced archive formats including jar (j for Java) and war (w for web) that store an entire runnable deployment, usually compressed.

== See also ==
- Comparison of archive formats
- Digital container format – File format to hold multiple data streams
- Disk image – Computer file with a storage device's contents
- File splitter – Type of software that splits an analog or digital signal into multiple signals
- List of archive formats
