= Terry Welch =

American computer scientist

- Born: Terry Archer Welch; January 20, 1939
- Died: November 22, 1988 (aged 49)
- Education: Massachusetts Institute of Technology
- Known for: Lempel–Ziv–Welch (LZW) compression
- Spouse: Raylene Welch
- Scientific career
- Thesis: Bounds on Information Retrieval Efficiency in Static File Structures (1971)
- Doctoral advisor: Peter Elias
- Doctoral students: Nick Tredennick

Terry Archer Welch (January 20, 1939 – November 22, 1988) was an American computer scientist. Along with Abraham Lempel and Jacob Ziv, he developed the lossless Lempel–Ziv–Welch (LZW) compression algorithm, which was published in 1984.

== Biography ==
Welch received a B.S., M.S. and Ph.D. degree at MIT in electrical engineering.

He taught at the University of Texas at Austin and worked in computer design at Honeywell in Waltham, Massachusetts. In 1976, he joined the Sperry Research Center in Sudbury as manager of computer architecture research for 7 years. While working at the Sperry Research Center, he published the LZW algorithm.

In 1983, he joined Digital Equipment Corporation (DEC) where he worked as a liaison to MCC's advanced computer architecture program.

He died of a brain tumor in 1988.

== Bibliography ==
- Welch, Terry (1984-06-01). "A Technique for High-Performance Data Compression" (PDF). Computer. 17 (6): 8–19. doi:10.1109/MC.1984.1659158. S2CID 2055321.
