= Self-synchronizing code =

Type of code in coding theory

In coding theory, especially in telecommunications, a self-synchronizing code is a uniquely decodable code in which the symbol stream formed by a portion of one code word, or by the overlapped portion of any two adjacent code words, is not a valid code word. Put another way, a set of strings (called code words) over an alphabet is called a self-synchronizing code if for each string obtained by concatenating two code words, the substring starting at the second symbol and ending at the second-last symbol does not contain any code word as substring. Every self-synchronizing code is a prefix code, but not all prefix codes are self-synchronizing.

Other terms for self-synchronizing code are synchronized code or, ambiguously, comma-free code. A self-synchronizing code permits the proper framing of transmitted code words provided that no uncorrected errors occur in the symbol stream; external synchronization is not required. Self-synchronizing codes also allow recovery from uncorrected errors in the stream; with most prefix codes, an uncorrected error in a single bit may propagate errors further in the stream and make the subsequent data corrupted.

Importance of self-synchronizing codes is not limited to data transmission. Self-synchronization also facilitates some cases of data recovery, for example of a digitally encoded text.

== Examples ==
- UTF-8 is self-synchronizing at the byte level because the leading byte (11xxxxxx) and subsequent bytes (10xxxxxx) of a multi-byte code point have different bit patterns.
- High Level Data Link Control (HDLC)
- Advanced Data Communication Control Procedures (ADCCP)
- Fibonacci coding

Counterexamples:

- The prefix code {00, 11} is not self-synchronizing; while 0, 1, 01 and 10 are not codes, 00 and 11 are.
- The prefix code {ab,ba} is not self-synchronizing because abab contains ba.
- The prefix code b^{∗}a (using the Kleene star) is not self-synchronizing (even though any new code word simply starts after a) because code word ba contains code word a.

== See also ==
- Bit slip
- Comma code
- Consistent overhead byte stuffing
- Dynkin sequence
- Kraus principle
- Kruskal's principle
- Overlapping instructions
- Pollard's lambda method
- Self-clocking signal
- Self-synchronizing block code
