= Connected component =

Connected component may refer to:

- Connected component (graph theory), a set of vertices in a graph that are linked to each other by paths
- Connected component (topology), a maximal subset of a topological space that cannot be covered by the union of two disjoint non-empty open sets

== See also ==
- Connected-component labeling, an algorithm for finding contiguous subsets of pixels in a digital image
