= Victor S. Miller =

American mathematician (born 1947)

Victor Saul Miller (born 3 March 1947 in Brooklyn, New York) is an American mathematician. He received his B.A. in mathematics from Columbia University in 1968, and his Ph.D. in mathematics from Harvard University in 1975. He was an assistant professor in the Mathematics Department of the University of Massachusetts Boston from 1973 to 1978. In 1978 he joined the IBM 801 project in the Computer Science Department of the Thomas J. Watson Research Center in Yorktown Heights, New York, and moved to the Mathematics Department in 1984. From 1993-2022 he was on the Research Staff of Center for Communications Research (CCR) of the Institute for Defense Analyses in Princeton, New Jersey, U.S. In 2022 he was a Research Scientist in the Statistics and Privacy Group of Meta Platforms. From 2023 through 2025 he was a Principal Computer Scientist in the Computer Science Laboratory of SRI International. In 2025 he was a Senior Research Scientist at Nexus Laboratories.

From 1984 through 1987 he was the editor of SIGACT news.

His main areas of interest are in computational number theory, combinatorics, data compression and cryptography. He is one of the co-inventors of elliptic-curve cryptography. He is also one of the co-inventors, with Mark Wegman, of the LZW data compression algorithm, and various extensions, one of which is used in the V.42bis international modem standard. He received an IEEE Millennium medal for this invention. He is also the inventor of Miller's Algorithm which is of fundamental use in pairing-based cryptography. He is also one of the co-inventors of the Lagarias-Miller-Odlyzko prime counting algorithm.

Miller is the recipient of the Certicom Recognition Award, the RSA Award for Excellence in Mathematics which was given in the RSA Conference 2009, the Eduard Rhein Stiftung Technology Award for 2020 and the Levchin Prize all for the invention of Elliptic Curve Cryptography. He is a Life Fellow of the IEEE, and a Fellow of the International Association for Cryptologic Research and the Association for Computing Machinery. He is also a member of Information Systems Security Association Hall of Fame
