= Raoul Kopelman =

Austrian-born American scientist (1933–2023)

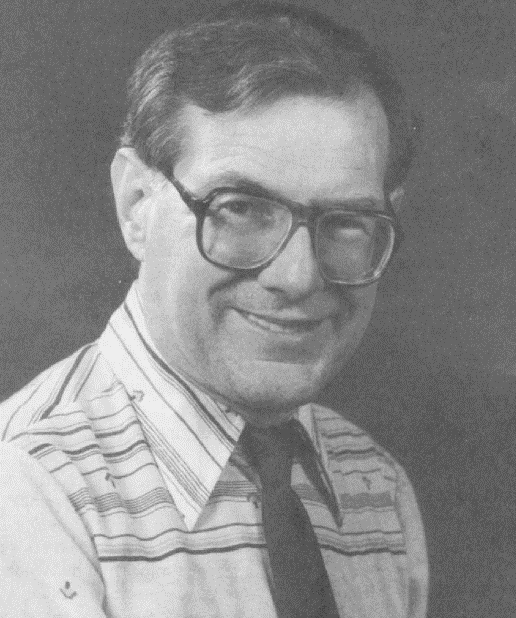
- Born: 21 October 1933; Vienna, Austria
- Died: 20 July 2023 (aged 89); Ann Arbor, Michigan
- Education: Technion; Columbia University
- Known for: Hoshen-Kopelman algorithm
- Scientific career
- Fields: Analytical chemistry Physical chemistry Nanoscience
- Workplaces: University of Michigan
- Doctoral students: Weihong Tan
- Other notable students: Richard Smalley (undergraduate); Paras N. Prasad (postdoc)

Raoul Kopelman (October 21, 1933 – July 20, 2023) was a scientist, inventor, and the Richard Smalley Distinguished University Professor of Chemistry, Physics, Applied Physics, Biophysics, Biomedical Engineering and Chemical Biology at the University of Michigan. Amongst other accomplishments, he was well known for developing the Hoshen-Kopelman algorithm. He was also amongst the first scientists pushing to establish the field of nanotechnology.

== Birth, education, and early career ==
Kopelman was born in Vienna, Austria, and on April 1, 1939, at the age of 5, he fled with his parents (Josef and Klara-Chaja) from Austria to Jerusalem during the Second World War.

Later, while living in Tel Aviv and in the sixth grade, his science teacher loaned him a German booklet on chemical experiments. With several other friends he formed a chemistry club, where they performed numerous experiments. The club included Assa Lifshitz (who went on to become a professor at the department of physical chemistry at the Hebrew University of Jerusalem) and Joshua Jortner (who went on to become a professor at the school of chemistry, Tel Aviv University in Tel Aviv, Israel).

With a desire of helping society, he later attended the Israel Institute of Technology to earn his bachelor's degree in chemical engineering and his master's degree in chemistry. He took classes on quantum mechanics with David Bohm and group theory with David Fox.

Kopelman studied under Ralph Halford to earn his PhD in chemistry at Columbia University. He also worked at Harvard as the first postdoctoral researcher of William Klemperer. After this, he worked as a lecturer in chemistry at the Israel Institute of Technology and a senior research fellow at the California Institute of Technology with Wilse Robinson.

== Educator and scientific researcher ==
In 1966, Kopelman accepted a professorship position in chemistry at the University of Michigan, where he served for 57 years.

As an educator, Kopelman successfully trained many active scientists in the fields of chemistry, biomedical engineering, applied physics and others. Students of his included Weihong Tan (PhD), Paras N. Prasad (postdoc), and Nobel laureate Richard Smalley (undergraduate researcher).

In his scientific work, he authored over 600 publications, including scientific papers, patents, and books with nearly 30,000 citations. His publications had an h-index of over 80 (h-indexes of over 60 are considered to be "truly exceptional").

Kopelman's work spanned many disciplines and collaborators. Some of his notable accomplishments included:

- Hoshen–Kopelman algorithm – "a simple and efficient algorithm for labeling clusters on a grid, where the grid is a regular network of cells, with the cells being either occupied or unoccupied"

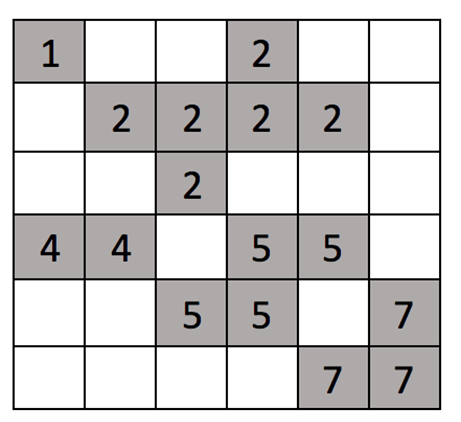
Example output from the Hoshen-Kopelman algorithm. Each number in the image represents a differentiable cluster.

- Pioneering nanotechnology – Kopelman was publishing so early in the field that journals forced him to remove "nano" from articles as it was not yet an accepted term (e.g. Nano-optics)
- Using pulled fiber optics for near-field optics (including published work with Eric Betzig) and for intracellular measurements
- Light sources smaller than the optical wavelength
- Multiple discoveries in nanosensors and nanomedicine
- Discovery of the largest ever electric fields in cells

== Awards ==
Kopelman's awards include

- Etter Memorial Lecture in Materials Chemistry, University of Minnesota
- Pittsburgh Analytical Chemistry Award, 2011
- Richard Smalley Distinguished University Professorship of Chemistry, Physics and Applied Physics, 2006
- ACS Division of Analytical Chemistry Award in Spectrochemical Analysis, 2005
- American Chemical Society Morley Award, 1997
- American Physical Society Lady Davis Fellowship
- Fellow of the American Association for the Advancement of Science
- Guggenheim Fellow, 1995
- J. William Fulbright Research Award
- National Institutes of Health National Research Service Award
- National Science Foundation Creativity Award
- Collegiate Inventors Grand Prize (together with Ph.D. student, Jeffrey Anker), 2002

== Personal life ==
Kopelman married his wife Chava Blodek on September 15, 1955. Together they had three children Orion, Leeron, and Shirli.
