= Tan Weihong =

Chinese chemist (born 1960)

- Born: May 12, 1960; Yiyang, Hunan, China
- Education: Hunan Normal University, Institute of Coal Chemistry Chinese Academy of Sciences, University of Michigan, Ann Arbor, Ames Laboratory
- Scientific career
- Fields: Analytical Chemistry
- Workplaces: University of Florida, Hunan University

Tan Weihong (Chinese: 谭蔚泓; born May 12, 1960) is a Chinese chemist. He is the University of Florida Distinguished Professor, V. T. and Louise Jackson Professor of Chemistry at the University of Florida, and also the Professor of Chemistry and Chemical Engineering, Professor of Biology, and Director of the State Key Laboratory of Chemo/Biosensing and Chemometrics at Hunan University in China. He was elected an academician of the Chinese Academy of Sciences in 2015 and The World Academy of Sciences in 2016.

== Early life and education ==
Tan was born on May 12, 1960, in Yiyang, Hunan, China. He received his B.S. degree in chemistry from Hunan Normal University in 1982, his M.S. degree in physical chemistry from the Institute of Coal Chemistry, Chinese Academy of Sciences in 1985, and his Ph.D. in physical chemistry from University of Michigan, Ann Arbor in 1992 under the supervision of Dr. Raoul Kopelman. In 1994–1995, he conducted his postdoctoral research at Ames Laboratory where he worked with Dr. Edward S. Yeung.

== Research ==
The main focus of Tan's group is in the field of DNA aptamers, molecular recognition and nano biosensors. The Tan group has pioneered the Whole-Cell Systematic Evolution of Ligands by Exponential Enrichment method (SELEX). This fundamental tool is used to select aptamer molecules against specific cell-lines for a wide range of applications. A variety of high sensitive aptamer-based molecular designs have been developed by Tan group and contributed to theranostic and bioanalysis studies.

Tan has served on many national and international research program committees, and also several Editorial and Advisory Boards, including ACS Nano and Analytical Chemistry.

Tan has helped develop a test for COVID-19 that produced results in as little as 40 minutes.

== Awards and honors ==
- Elected to The World Academy of Sciences, 2016
- Elected to the Chinese Academy of Sciences, 2015
- HHMI Distinguished Mentor Award, 2014
- University Postdoc Mentor Award, 2014
- ACS Florida Achievement Award, American Chemical Society Florida Section, 2012
- Iddles Lecturer for 2012, University of New Hampshire, 2012
- University of Florida Distinguished Professor, University of Florida, 2012 to now
- Howard Hughes Medical Institute Distinguished Mentor Award, University of Florida, 2010
- Senior Fellow Award, Japan Society of Science and Technology, Tokyo University, 2010
- National Distinguished experts, China, 2009 to now
- V. T. and Louis Jackson Professor, Endowed Chair Professorship at University of Florida, 2008 to now
- Vice Chair and Chair-elect, Chair, Gordon Research Conference on Bioanalytical Sensors, 2007-2010
- NIH Enabling bioanalytical and biophysical technologies study section member, 2007-2011
- President-elect, President, Sigma Xi Society, University of Florida Chapter, 2004-2005-2006
- Honorary Professor, Changchun Int. of Applied Chem., Chinese Academy of Sciences, August, 2006
- Elected Fellow, The American Association for the Advancement of Science (AAAS), 2005
- Research Excellence Scholar, Chinese Academy of Sciences, Beijing, China, August, 2005
- UF Research Foundation Professorship Award, University of Florida, 2004-2007
- Pittsburgh Conference Achievement Award, Pittsburgh Conference on Analytical Chemistry and Applied Spectroscopy, March, 2004
- Science and Technology Award, Japan Society of Science and Technology, 2003
- Packard Science and Technology Award, Packard Foundation, 2002
- Cheungkong Research Scholar, Li Ka Shing Foundation, Hong Kong, 2001
- Junior Faculty Research Award, Sigma Xi, The Scientific Research Society, 2000
- Science and Technology Fellowship Award, Japan Society of Science and Technology, 2000
- Distinguished Overseas Scholar Award, National Science Foundation of China, 2000
- Biomedical Engineering Award, Whitaker Foundation, 1998
- Cottrell Scholar, Research Corporation, 1999
- Young Investigator Award, Office of Naval Research, Department of Defense, 1998
- NSF Faculty Career Award, National Science Foundation, 1998
- Beckman Young Investigator Award, Arnold Beckman Foundation, 1997
