= Hoshen–Kopelman algorithm =

Algorithm for labeling clusters on a grid

The Hoshen–Kopelman algorithm is a simple and efficient algorithm for labeling clusters on a grid, where the grid is a regular network of cells, with the cells being either occupied or unoccupied. This algorithm is based on a well-known union-finding algorithm. The algorithm was originally described by Joseph Hoshen and Raoul Kopelman in their 1976 paper "Percolation and Cluster Distribution. I. Cluster Multiple Labeling Technique and Critical Concentration Algorithm".

== Percolation theory ==
Percolation theory is the study of the behavior and statistics of clusters on lattices. Suppose we have a large square lattice where each cell can be occupied with the probability p and can be empty with the probability 1 – p. Each group of neighboring occupied cells forms a cluster. Neighbors are defined as cells having a common side but not those sharing only a corner i.e. we consider the 4-connected neighborhood that is top, bottom, left and right. Each occupied cell is independent of the status of its neighborhood. The number of clusters, the size of each cluster and their distribution are important topics in percolation theory.

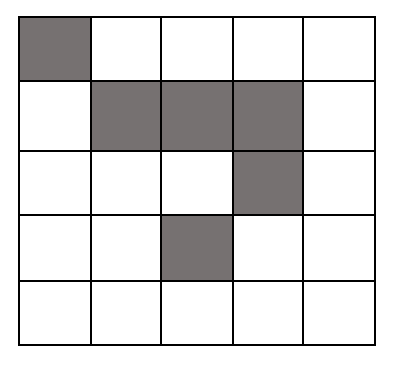
Figure (a)

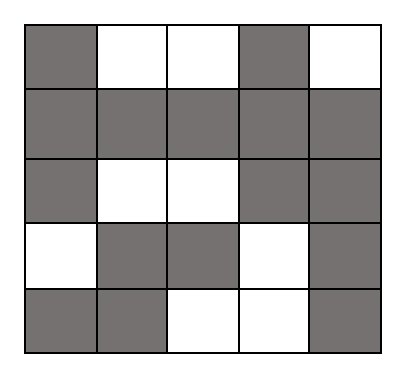
Figure (b)

Consider 5x5 grids in figures (a) and (b).
In figure (a), the probability of occupancy is p = 6/25 = 0.24.
In figure (b), the probability of occupancy is p = 16/25 = 0.64.

== Hoshen–Kopelman algorithm for cluster finding ==
In this algorithm, we scan through a grid looking for occupied cells and labeling them with cluster labels. The scanning process is called a raster scan. The algorithm begins with scanning the grid cell by cell and checking whether the cell is occupied or not. If the cell is occupied, then it must be labeled with a cluster label. This cluster label is assigned based on the neighbors of that cell. (For this we are going to use Union-Find Algorithm which is explained in the next section.) If the cell doesn’t have any occupied neighbors, then a new label is assigned to the cell.

== Union-find algorithm ==
This algorithm is used to represent disjoint sets. Calling the function union(x,y) places items x and y into the same set. A second function find(x) returns a representative member of the set to which x belongs. The representative member of the set containing x is the label we will apply to the cluster to which x belongs. A key to the efficiency of the Union-Find Algorithm is that the find operation improves the underlying forest data structure that represents the sets, making future find queries more efficient.

== Pseudocode ==
During the raster scan of the grid, whenever an occupied cell is encountered, neighboring cells are scanned to check whether any of them have already been scanned. If we find already scanned neighbors, the union operation is performed, to specify that these neighboring cells are in fact members of the same set. Then thefind operation is performed to find a representative member of that set with which the current cell will be labeled.

On the other hand, if the current cell has no neighbors, it is assigned a new, previously unused, label. The entire grid is processed in this way.

Following pseudocode is referred from Tobin Fricke's implementation of the same algorithm. On completion, the cluster labels may be found in labels. Not shown is the second raster scan of the grid needed to produce the example output. In that scan, the value at label[x,y] is replaced by find(label[x,y]).

Raster Scan and Labeling on the Grid
largest_label = 0;
label = zeros[n_columns, n_rows]
labels = [0:n_columns*n_rows] /* Array containing integers from 0 to the size of the image. */

for x in 0 to n_columns {
    for y in 0 to n_rows {
        if occupied[x, y] then
            left = label[x-1, y];
            above = label[x, y-1];
            if (left == 0) and (above == 0) then /* Neither a label above nor to the left. */
                largest_label = largest_label + 1; /* Make a new, as-yet-unused cluster label. */
                label[x, y] = largest_label;
            else if (left != 0) and (above == 0) then /* One neighbor, to the left. */
                label[x, y] = find(left);
            else if (left == 0) and (above != 0) then /* One neighbor, above. */
                label[x, y] = find(above);
            else /* Neighbors BOTH to the left and above. */
                union(left,above); /* Link the left and above clusters. */
                label[x, y] = find(left);
    }
}

Union
void union(int x, int y) {
    labels[find(x)] = find(y);
}

Find
int find(int x) {
    int y = x;

    while (labels[y] != y)
        y = labels[y];

    while (labels[x] != x)  {
        int z = labels[x];
        labels[x] = y;
        x = z;
    }

    return y;
}

== Example ==
Consider the following example. The dark cells in the grid in Figure (c) represent that they are occupied and the white ones are empty. So by running H–K algorithm on this input we would get the output as shown in Figure (d) with all the clusters labeled.

The algorithm processes the input grid, cell by cell, as follows: Let's say that grid is a two-dimensional array.

- Starting from cell grid[0][0] i.e. the first cell. The cell is occupied and it doesn't have cells to the left or above so we will label this cell with a new label say 1.
- grid[0][1] and grid[0][2] both are unoccupied so they are not labeled.
- grid[0][3] is occupied so check cell to the left which is unoccupied so we increment the current label value and assign the label to the cell as 2.
- grid[0][4], grid[0][5] and grid[1][0] are unoccupied so they are not labeled.
- grid[1][1] is occupied so check cell to the left and above, both the cells are unoccupied so assign a new label 3.
- grid[1][2] is occupied so check cell to the left and above, only the cell to the left is occupied so assign the label of a cell on the left to this cell 3.
- grid[1][3] is occupied so check cell to the left and above, both the cells are occupied, so merge the two clusters and assign the cluster label of the cell above to the cell on the left and to this cell i.e. 2. (Merging using union algorithm will label all the cells with label 3 to 2)
- grid[1][4] is occupied so check cell to the left and above, only the cell to the left is occupied so assign the label of a cell on the left to this cell 2.
- grid[1][5] , grid[2][0] and grid[2][1] are unoccupied so they are not labeled.
- grid[2][2] is occupied so check cell to the left and above, only cell above is occupied so assign the label of the cell above to this cell 2.
- grid[2][3] , grid[2][4] and grid[2][5] are unoccupied so they are not labeled.
- grid[3][0] is occupied so check cell above which is unoccupied so we increment the current label value and assign the label to the cell as 4.
- grid[3][1] is occupied so check cell to the left and above, only the cell to the left is occupied so assign the label of the cell on the left to this cell 4.
- grid[3][2] is unoccupied so it is not labeled.
- grid[3][3] is occupied so check cell to the left and above, both the cells are unoccupied so assign a new label 5.
- grid[3][4] is occupied so check cell to the left and above, only the cell to the left is occupied so assign the label of the cell on the left to this cell 5.
- grid[3][5] , grid[4][0] and grid[4][1] are unoccupied so they are not labeled.
- grid[4][2] is occupied so check cell to the left and above, both the cells are unoccupied so assign a new label 6.
- grid[4][3] is occupied so check cell to the left and above, both, cell to the left and above are occupied so merge the two clusters and assign the cluster label of the cell above to the cell on the left and to this cell i.e. 5. (Merging using union algorithm will label all the cells with label 6 to 5).
- grid[4][4] is unoccupied so it is not labeled.
- grid[4][5] is occupied so check cell to the left and above, both the cells are unoccupied so assign a new label 7.
- grid[5][0] , grid[5][1] , grid[5][2] and grid[5][3] are unoccupied so they are not labeled.
- grid[5][4] is occupied so check cell to the left and above, both the cells are unoccupied so assign a new label 8.
- grid[5][5] is occupied so check cell to the left and above, both, cell to the left and above are occupied so merge the two clusters and assign the cluster label of the cell above to the cell on the left and to this cell i.e. 7. (Merging using union algorithm will label all the cells with label 8 to 7).

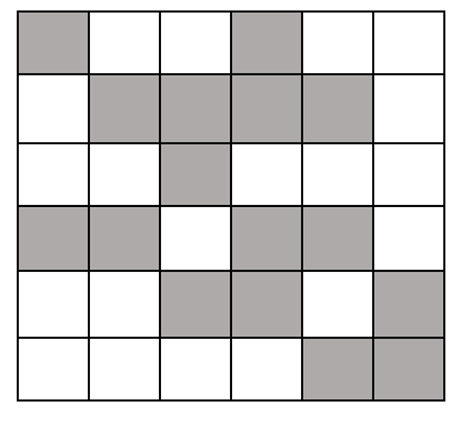
Figure (c)

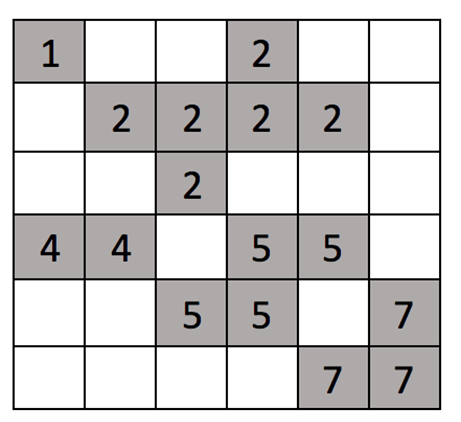
Figure (d)

Consider 6x6 grids in figure (c) and (d).
Figure (c) is the input to the Hoshen–Kopelman algorithm.
Figure (b) is the output of the algorithm with all the clusters labeled.

== Applications ==
- Determination of Nodal Domain Area and Nodal Line Lengths
- Nodal Connectivity Information
- Modeling of electrical conduction

== See also ==
- K-means clustering algorithm
- Fuzzy clustering algorithm
- Gaussian (Expectation Maximization) clustering algorithm
- Clustering Methods
- C-means Clustering Algorithm
- Connected-component labeling
