= Pollard's rho algorithm for logarithms =

Mathematical algorithm

Pollard's rho algorithm for logarithms is an algorithm introduced by John Pollard in 1978 to solve the discrete logarithm problem, analogous to Pollard's rho algorithm to solve the integer factorization problem.

The goal is to compute $\gamma$ such that $\alpha ^ \gamma = \beta$, where $\beta$ belongs to a cyclic group $G$ generated by $\alpha$. The algorithm computes integers $a$, $b$, $A$, and $B$ such that $\alpha^a \beta^b = \alpha^A \beta^B$. If the underlying group is cyclic of order $n$, by substituting $\beta$ as ${\alpha}^{\gamma}$ and noting that two powers are equal if and only if the exponents are equivalent modulo the order of the base, in this case modulo $n$, we get that $\gamma$ is one of the solutions of the equation $(B-b) \gamma = (a-A) \pmod n$. Solutions to this equation are easily obtained using the extended Euclidean algorithm.

To find the needed $a$, $b$, $A$, and $B$ the algorithm uses Floyd's cycle-finding algorithm to find a cycle in the sequence $x_i = \alpha^{a_i} \beta^{b_i}$, where the function $f: x_i \mapsto x_{i+1}$ is assumed to be random-looking and thus is likely to enter into a loop of approximate length $\sqrt{\frac{\pi n}{8}}$ after $\sqrt{\frac{\pi n}{8}}$ steps. One way to define such a function is to use the following rules: Partition $G$ into three disjoint subsets $S_0$, $S_1$, and $S_2$ of approximately equal size using a hash function. If $x_i$ is in $S_0$ then double both $a$ and $b$; if $x_i \in S_1$ then increment $a$, if $x_i \in S_2$ then increment $b$.

== Algorithm ==
Let $G$ be a cyclic group of order $n$, and given $\alpha, \beta\in G$, and a partition $G = S_0\cup S_1\cup S_2$, let $f:G\to G$ be the map

$$f(x) = \begin{cases}
\beta x & x\in S_0\\
x^2 & x\in S_1\\
\alpha x & x\in S_2
\end{cases}.$$

If this map is applied to $x = \alpha^a \beta^b \in G$, then we can define maps $g:G\times\mathbb{Z}\to\mathbb{Z}$ and $h:G\times\mathbb{Z}\to\mathbb{Z}$ to track the indices of $\alpha$ and $\beta$ of the result. These maps would be given by

$$\begin{align}
g(x,k) &= \begin{cases}
k & x\in S_0\\
2k \pmod {n} & x\in S_1\\
k+1 \pmod {n} & x\in S_2
\end{cases}, \qquad \mbox{and}
\\
h(x,k) &= \begin{cases}
k+1 \pmod {n} & x\in S_0\\
2k \pmod {n} & x\in S_1\\
k & x\in S_2
\end{cases}.
\end{align}$$

input: a: a generator of G
       b: an element of G
output: An integer x such that ax = b, or failure

Initialise i ← 0, a0 ← 0, b0 ← 0, x0 ← 1 ∈ G

loop
    i ← i + 1

    xi ← f(xi−1),
    ai ← g(xi−1, ai−1),
    bi ← h(xi−1, bi−1)

    x2i−1 ← f(x2i−2),
    a2i−1 ← g(x2i−2, a2i−2),
    b2i−1 ← h(x2i−2, b2i−2)
    x2i ← f(x2i−1),
    a2i ← g(x2i−1, a2i−1),
    b2i ← h(x2i−1, b2i−1)
while xi ≠ x2i

r ← bi − b2i
if r = 0 return failure
return r−1(a2i − ai) mod n

== Example ==
Consider, for example, the group generated by 2 modulo $N=1019$ (the order of the group is $n=1018$, 2 generates the group of units modulo 1019). The algorithm is implemented by the following C++ program:

import std;

using std::tuple;

constexpr int n = 1018;
constexpr int N = n + 1; // N = 1019 is prime
constexpr int alpha = 2; // generator
constexpr int beta = 5; // 2^10 = 1024 = 5 (N)

tuple<int, int, int> nextTuple(int x, int a, int b) noexcept {
    switch (x % 3) {
        case 0:
             return {(x * x) % N, (a * 2) % n, (b * 2) % n};
        case 1:
             return {(x * alpha) % N, (a + 1) % n, b};
        case 2:
             return {(x * beta) % N, a, (b + 1) % n};
        default:
            std::unreachable();
    }
}

int main() {
    tuple<int, int, int> tortoise = {1, 0, 0};
    tuple<int, int, int> hare = tortoise;
    std::println("  i     x   a   b    x'  a'  b'");
    std::println(" ------------------------------");
    for (int i = 1; i < n; ++i) {
        tortoise = nextTuple(tortoise);
        hare = nextTuple(nextTuple(hare));
        std::println(
            "{:>3} {:>5} {:>3} {:>3} {:>5} {:>3} {:>3}", i,
            tortoise.x, tortoise.a, tortoise.b,
            hare.x, hare.a, hare.b
        );
        if (tortoise.x == hare.x) {
            break;
        }
    }
}

The results are as follows (edited):

 i     x   a   b    x'  a'  b'
------------------------------
 1     2   1   0    10   1   1
 2    10   1   1   100   2   2
 3    20   2   1  1000   3   3
 4   100   2   2   425   8   6
 5   200   3   2   436  16  14
 6  1000   3   3   284  17  15
 7   981   4   3   986  17  17
 8   425   8   6   194  17  19
..............................
48   224 680 376    86 299 412
49   101 680 377   860 300 413
50   505 680 378   101 300 415
51  1010 681 378  1010 301 416

That is $2^{681} 5^{378} = 1010 = 2^{301} 5^{416} \pmod{1019}$ and so $(416-378)\gamma = 681-301 \pmod{1018}$, for which $\gamma_1=10$ is a solution as expected. As $n=1018$ is not prime, there is another solution $\gamma_2=519$, for which $2^{519} = 1014 = -5\pmod{1019}$ holds.

== Complexity ==
The running time is approximately $\mathcal{O}(\sqrt{n})$. If used together with the Pohlig–Hellman algorithm, the running time of the combined algorithm is $\mathcal{O}(\sqrt{p})$, where $p$ is the largest prime factor of $n$.
