= Comma-free code =

A comma-free code is block code in which no concatenation of two code words contains a valid code word that overlaps both.

Comma-free codes are also known as self-synchronizing block codes because no synchronization is required to find the beginning of a code word.

In the literature, the requirement that all code words have to have the same length is sometimes dropped, resulting in the same class as self-synchronizing codes, see Self-synchronizing code.

== See also ==
- Self-synchronizing code
- UTF-8, a comma-free character encoding
