= Ziv–Zakai bound =

Theoretical bound used in estimation theory

The Ziv–Zakai bound (named after Jacob Ziv and Moshe Zakai) is used in theory of estimations to provide a lower bound on possible-probable error involving some random parameter $X$ from a noisy observation $Y$. The bound works by connecting probability of the excess error to the hypothesis testing. The bound is considered to be tighter than Cramér–Rao bound albeit more involved. Several modern versions of the bound have been introduced following the original version published in 1969.

== Simple Form of the Bound ==
Suppose we want to estimate a random variable $X$ with the probability density $f_X$ from a noisy observation $Y$. Then for any estimator $g$ a simple form of Ziv-Zakai bound is given by

$$\begin{aligned}
& \mathbb{E}\bigl[|X - g(Y)|^2\bigr] \ge \frac{1}{2} \int_{0}^{\infty} t
\int_{-\infty}^{\infty} \bigl(f_X(x) + f_X(x+t)\bigr)\, P_e(x, x+t)\,\mathrm{d}x\,\mathrm{d}t,
\end{aligned}$$

where $P_e(x, x+t)$ is the minimum (Bayes) error probability for the binary hypothesis testing problem between

$$\begin{aligned}
\mathcal{H}_0&: Y \mid X = x \\
\mathcal{H}_1&:  Y \mid X = x + t
\end{aligned}$$

with prior probabilities $\Pr(\mathcal{H}_0) = \frac{f_X(x)}{f_X(x) + f_X(x + t) }$ and $\Pr(\mathcal{H}_1) = 1 - \Pr(\mathcal{H}_0)$.

== Generalization ==
The original lower bound can be tightened by introducing a notion of the valley-filling function, which for a function $f$

$\mathcal{V}_t(f) = \sup_{u: u \ge t} f(u)$

with the bound given by

$$\begin{aligned}
& \mathbb{E}\bigl[|X - g(Y)|^2\bigr] \ge \frac{1}{2} \int_{0}^{\infty} t
\mathcal{V} \left\{\int_{-\infty}^{\infty} \bigl(f_X(x) + f_X(x+t)\bigr)\, P_e(x, x+t)\,\mathrm{d}x\, \right\}\mathrm{d}t,
\end{aligned}$$

The most general version of the bound, which holds for both continuous and discrete random vectors, is also available.

== Tightness ==
Ziv-Zakai bound has some general tightness guarantees, such as

- For continuous random variables:
  - The bound is tight in the high signal-to-noise ratio regime for continuous random vectors.
  - In the low signal-to-noise ratio regime, the bound is tight if unimodal and symmetric with respect to its mode.
- For discrete random variables:
  - The bound requires a valley-filling function; otherwise, the bound is equal to zero.
  - The bound is typically not tight for discrete random variables.
  - A version of the bound known as the single point Ziv-Zakai bound is generally tighter than other versions of Ziv-Zakai.

== Applications ==
The Ziv-Zakai bound has several appealing advantages. Unlike the other bounds, the Ziv-Zakai bound only requires one regularity condition, that is, the parameter under estimation needs to have a probability density function. Hence, the Ziv-Zakai bound has a broader applicability than, for instance, the Cramér-Rao bound, which requires several smoothness assumptions on the probability density function of the estimand.

Some of the use-cases that have been informed by the Ziv-Zakai bound are:

- quantum parameter estimation
- time delay estimation
- time of arrival estimation
- direction of arrival estimation
- MIMO radar

== See also ==
- Information theory
- Signal processing
