= John Pollard (mathematician) =

British mathematician

John M. Pollard (born 1941) is a British mathematician who has invented algorithms for the factorization of large numbers and for the calculation of discrete logarithms.

His factorization algorithms include the rho, p − 1, and the first version of the special number field sieve, which has since been improved by others.

His discrete logarithm algorithms include the rho algorithm for logarithms and the kangaroo algorithm. He received the RSA Award for Excellence in Mathematics.
