= Abraham Lempel =

Israeli computer scientist (1936–2023)

- אברהם למפל
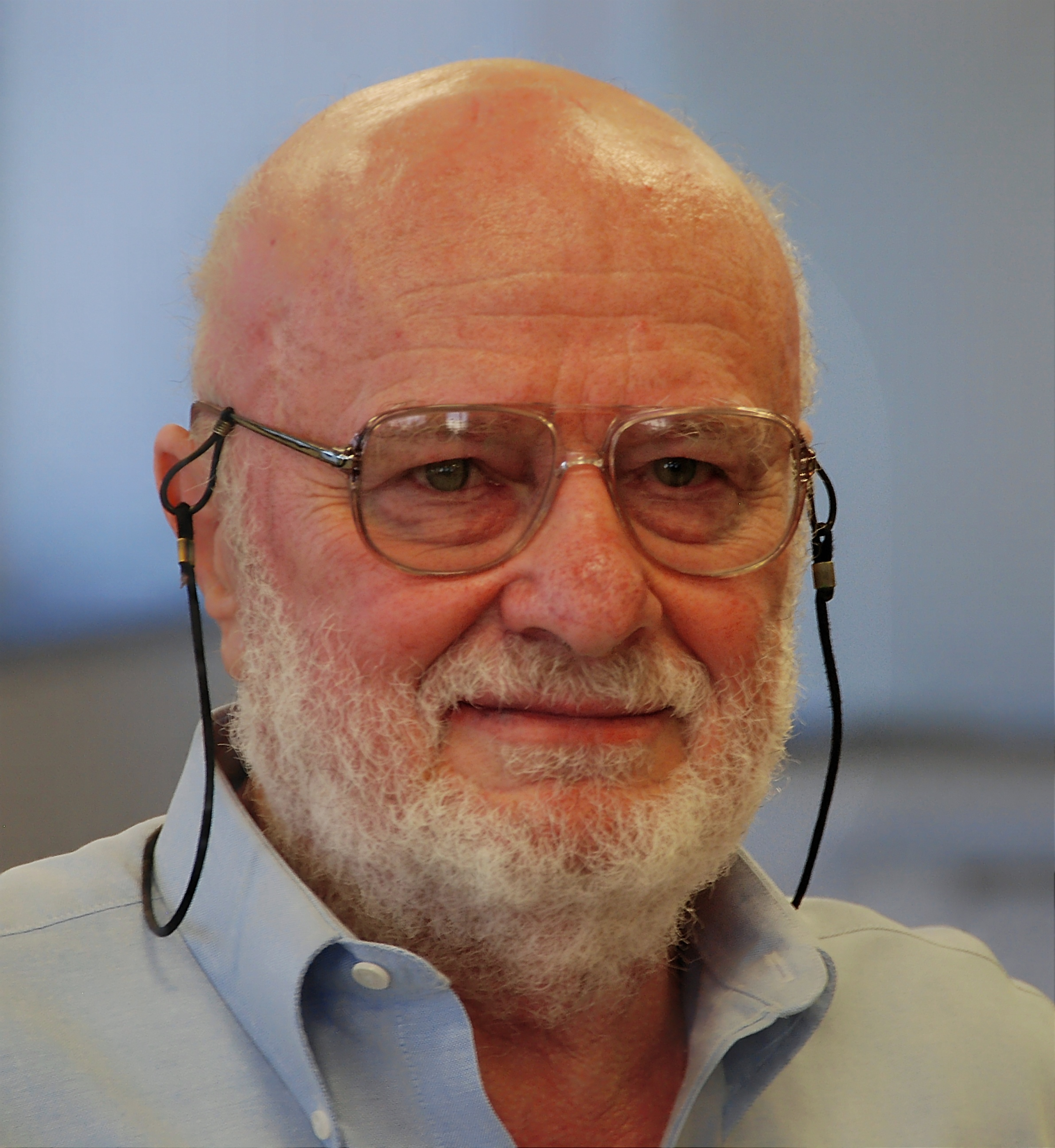
- Lempel in 2007
- Born: 10 February 1936; Lwów, Second Polish Republic (now Lviv, Ukraine)
- Died: 4 February 2023 (aged 86)
- Known for: LZ77 and LZ78 compression algorithms
- Awards: Paris Kanellakis Award (1997); IEEE Richard W. Hamming Medal (2007)
- Scientific career
- Fields: Information theory
- Workplaces: Technion - Israel Institute of Technology

Abraham Lempel (Hebrew: אברהם למפל; 10 February 1936 – 4 February 2023) was an Israeli computer scientist and one of the fathers of the LZ family of lossless data compression algorithms.

== Biography ==
Lempel was born on 10 February 1936 in Lwów, Poland (now Lviv, Ukraine). He studied at Technion - Israel Institute of Technology, and received a B.Sc. in 1963, an M.Sc. in 1965, and a D.Sc. in 1967. Since 1977 he held the title of full professor, and was a professor emeritus at Technion.

His historically important works start with the presentation of the LZ77 algorithm in a paper entitled "A Universal Algorithm for Sequential Data Compression" in the IEEE Transactions on Information Theory (May 1977), co-authored by Jacob Ziv.

Lempel was the recipient of the 1998 Golden Jubilee Award for Technological Innovation from the IEEE Information Theory Society; and the 2007 IEEE Richard W. Hamming Medal for "pioneering work in data compression, especially the Lempel-Ziv algorithm".

Lempel founded HP Labs—Israel in 1994, and served as its director until October 2007.

Lempel died on 4 February 2023, at age 86.

== Works ==
The LZ77 and LZ78 algorithms authored by Lempel and Jacob Ziv have led to a number of derivative works, including the Lempel–Ziv–Welch algorithm, used in the GIF image format, and the Lempel-Ziv-Markov chain algorithm, used in the 7-Zip and xz compressors. The algorithms have also been used as originally published in formats such as DEFLATE, used in the PNG image format.

== Bibliography ==
- Jacob Ziv, Abraham Lempel (May 1977). "A Universal Algorithm for Sequential Data Compression". IEEE Transactions on Information Theory. 23 (3): 337–343. doi:10.1109/TIT.1977.1055714. S2CID 9267632.

== See also ==
- Timeline of algorithms
- Data compression
- Oblivious transfer
