= Mark N. Wegman =

American computer scientist

Mark N. Wegman is an American computer scientist known for his contributions to algorithms and compiler optimization. Wegman received his B.A. from New York University and his Ph.D. from the University of California, Berkeley. He joined IBM Research in 1975, where he currently serves as head of Computer Science. He is a member of the IBM Academy of Technology and a Fellow of the Association for Computing Machinery (1996) and the Institute of Electrical and Electronics Engineers. He became an IBM Fellow in 2007. He was elected to the National Academy of Engineering in 2010.

Wegman is best known for being one of the inventors of the Static-single assignment form, which is used in the analysis portion of most if not all modern optimizing compilers. This work was recognized by SIGPLAN in 2006 with its Programming Languages Achievement Award. He has also made contributions to algorithms and information theory including universal hashing and the LZMW data compression algorithm.
