= Disjoint-set data structure =

Data structure for storing non-overlapping sets

Disjoint-set/Union-find Forest
- Type: multiway tree
- Invented: 1964
- Invented by: Bernard A. Galler and Michael J. Fischer
Time complexity in big O notation
| Operation | Average | Worst case |
| Search | O(α(n)) (amortized) | O(α(n)) (amortized) |
| Insert | O(1) | O(1) |
Space complexity
| Space | O(n) | O(n) |

In computer science, a disjoint-set data structure, also called a union–find data structure or merge–find set, is a data structure that stores a collection of disjoint (non-overlapping) sets. Equivalently, it stores a partition of a set into disjoint subsets. It provides operations for adding new sets, merging sets (replacing them with their union), and finding a representative member of a set. The last operation makes it possible to determine efficiently whether any two elements belong to the same set or to different sets.

While there are several ways of implementing disjoint-set data structures, in practice they are often identified with a particular implementation known as a disjoint-set forest. This specialized type of forest performs union and find operations in near-constant amortized time. For a sequence of m addition, union, or find operations on a disjoint-set forest with n nodes, the total time required is O(mα(n)), where α(n) is the extremely slow-growing inverse Ackermann function. Although disjoint-set forests do not guarantee this time per operation, each operation rebalances the structure (via tree compression) so that subsequent operations become faster. As a result, disjoint-set forests are both asymptotically optimal and practically efficient.

Disjoint-set data structures play a key role in Kruskal's algorithm for finding the minimum spanning tree of a graph. The importance of minimum spanning trees means that disjoint-set data structures support a wide variety of algorithms. In addition, these data structures find applications in symbolic computation and in compilers, especially for register allocation problems.

== History ==
Disjoint-set forests were first described by Bernard A. Galler and Michael J. Fischer in 1964. In 1973, their time complexity was bounded to $O(\log^{*}(n))$, the iterated logarithm of $n$, by Hopcroft and Ullman. In 1975, Robert Tarjan was the first to prove the $O(m\alpha(n))$ (inverse Ackermann function) upper bound on the algorithm's time complexity. He also proved it to be tight. In 1979, he showed that this was the lower bound for a certain class of algorithms, pointer algorithms, that include the Galler-Fischer structure. In 1989, Fredman and Saks showed that $\Omega(\alpha(n))$ (amortized) words of $O(\log n)$ bits must be accessed by any disjoint-set data structure per operation, thereby proving the optimality of the data structure in this model.

In 1991, Galil and Italiano published a survey of data structures for disjoint-sets.

In 1994, Richard J. Anderson and Heather Woll described a parallelized version of Union–Find that never needs to block.

In 2007, Sylvain Conchon and Jean-Christophe Filliâtre developed a semi-persistent version of the disjoint-set forest data structure and formalized its correctness using the proof assistant Rocq (then: Coq). "Semi-persistent" means that previous versions of the structure are efficiently retained, but accessing previous versions of the data structure invalidates later ones. Their fastest implementation achieves performance almost as efficient as the non-persistent algorithm. They do not perform a complexity analysis.

Variants of disjoint-set data structures with better performance on a restricted class of problems have also been considered. Gabow and Tarjan showed that if the possible unions are restricted in certain ways, then a truly linear time algorithm is possible. In particular, linear time is achievable if a "union tree" is given a priori. This is a tree that includes all elements of the sets. Let p[v] denote the parent in the tree, then the assumption is that union operations must have the form union(v,p[v]) for some v.

== Representation ==
In this and the following section we describe the most common implementation of the disjoint-set data structure, as a forest of parent pointer trees. This representation is known as Galler-Fischer trees.

Each node contains a single pointer. For non-root nodes, this is a pointer to its parent. Roots are distinguished by pointing to themselves; their parent pointers are circular references. (A null pointer or some other sentinel value is also possible, although less convenient.) Each tree represents a set stored in the forest, with the members of the set being the nodes in the tree. Root nodes provide set representatives: Two nodes are in the same set if and only if the trees they are members of have the same root.

Some algorithms require some auxiliary information in each root node: a tree size, or a rank (but not both). In the detailed descriptions below, these are assumed to be separate fields, but as they are only needed in root nodes, they may often be stored in the parent pointer field using a tagged pointer.

Nodes in the forest can be stored in any way convenient to the application, but a common technique is to store them in an array. In this case, parents can be indicated by their array index. Every array entry requires log_{2} n bits of storage for the parent pointer. A comparable or lesser amount of storage is required for the rest of the entry, so the number of bits required to store the forest is Θ(n log n). If an implementation uses fixed size nodes (thereby limiting the maximum size of the forest that can be stored), then the necessary storage is linear in n.

== Operations ==
Disjoint-set data structures support three operations: Making a new set containing a new element; Finding the representative of the set containing a given element; and Merging two sets.

=== Making new sets ===
The MakeSet operation adds a new element into a new set containing only the new element, and the new set is added to the data structure. If the data structure is instead viewed as a partition of a set, then the MakeSet operation enlarges the set by adding the new element, and it extends the existing partition by putting the new element into a new subset containing only the new element.

In a disjoint-set forest, MakeSet initializes the node's parent pointer and the node's size or rank. If a root is represented by a node that points to itself, then adding an element can be described using the following pseudocode:

function MakeSet(x) is
    if x is not already in the forest then
        x.parent := x
        x.size := 1     // if nodes store size
        x.rank := 0     // if nodes store rank
    end if
end function

This operation has linear time complexity. In particular, initializing a disjoint-set forest with n nodes requires O(n) time.

Lack of a parent assigned to the node implies that the node is not present in the forest.

In practice, MakeSet must be preceded by an operation that allocates memory to hold x. As long as memory allocation is an amortized constant-time operation, as it is for a good dynamic array implementation, it does not change the asymptotic performance of the random-set forest.

=== Finding set representatives ===
The Find operation follows the chain of parent pointers from a specified query node x until it reaches a root element. This root element represents the set to which x belongs and may be x itself. Find returns the root element it reaches.

Performing a Find operation presents an important opportunity for improving the forest. The time in a Find operation is spent chasing parent pointers, so a flatter tree leads to faster Find operations. When a Find is executed, there is no faster way to reach the root than by following each parent pointer in succession. However, the parent pointers visited during this search can be updated to point closer to the root. Because every element visited on the way to a root is part of the same set, this does not change the sets stored in the forest. But it makes future Find operations faster, not only for the nodes between the query node and the root, but also for their descendants. This updating is an important part of the disjoint-set forest's amortized performance guarantee.

There are several algorithms for Find that achieve the asymptotically optimal time complexity. One family of algorithms, known as path compression, makes every node between the query node and the root point to the root. Path compression can be implemented using a simple recursion as follows:

function Find(x) is
    if x.parent = x then
        return x
    else
        x.parent := Find(x.parent)
        return x.parent
    end if
end function

This implementation makes two passes, one up the tree and one back down. It requires enough scratch memory to store the path from the query node to the root (in the above pseudocode, the path is implicitly represented using the call stack). This can be decreased to a constant amount of memory by performing both passes in the same direction. The constant memory implementation walks from the query node to the root twice, once to find the root and once to update pointers:

function Find(x) is
    root := x
    while root.parent ≠ root do
        root := root.parent
    end while

    while x.parent ≠ root do
        parent := x.parent
        x.parent := root
        x := parent
    end while

    return root
end function

Tarjan and van Leeuwen also developed one-pass Find algorithms that retain the same worst-case complexity but are more efficient in practice. These are called path splitting and path halving. Both of these update the parent pointers of nodes on the path between the query node and the root. Path splitting replaces every parent pointer on that path by a pointer to the node's grandparent:

function Find(x) is
    while x.parent ≠ x do
        (x, x.parent) := (x.parent, x.parent.parent)
    end while
    return x
end function

Path halving works similarly but replaces only every other parent pointer:

function Find(x) is
    while x.parent ≠ x do
        x.parent := x.parent.parent
        x := x.parent
    end while
    return x
end function

=== Merging two sets ===
MakeSet creates 8 singletons.

After some operations of Union, some sets are grouped together.

The operation Union(x, y) replaces the set containing x and the set containing y with their union. Union first uses Find to determine the roots of the trees containing x and y. If the roots are the same, there is nothing more to do. Otherwise, the two trees must be merged. This is done by either setting the parent pointer of x's root to y's, or setting the parent pointer of y's root to x's.

The choice of which node becomes the parent has consequences for the complexity of future operations on the tree. If it is done carelessly, trees can become excessively tall. For example, suppose that Union always made the tree containing x a subtree of the tree containing y. Begin with a forest that has just been initialized with elements $1, 2, 3, \ldots, n,$ and execute Union(1, 2), Union(2, 3), ..., Union(n - 1, n). The resulting forest contains a single tree whose root is n, and the path from 1 to n passes through every node in the tree. For this forest, the time to run Find(1) is O(n).

In an efficient implementation, tree height is controlled using union by size or union by rank. Both of these require a node to store information besides just its parent pointer. This information is used to decide which root becomes the new parent. Both strategies ensure that trees do not become too deep.

==== Union by size ====
In the case of union by size, a node stores its size, which is simply its number of descendants (including the node itself). When the trees with roots x and y are merged, the node with more descendants becomes the parent. If the two nodes have the same number of descendants, then either one can become the parent. In both cases, the size of the new parent node is set to its new total number of descendants.

function Union(x, y) is
    // Replace nodes by roots
    x := Find(x)
    y := Find(y)

    if x = y then
        return  // x and y are already in the same set
    end if

    // If necessary, swap variables to ensure that
    // x has at least as many descendants as y
    if x.size < y.size then
        (x, y) := (y, x)
    end if

    // Make x the new root
    y.parent := x
    // Update the size of x
    x.size := x.size + y.size
end function

The number of bits necessary to store the size is clearly the number of bits necessary to store n. This adds a constant factor to the forest's required storage.

==== Union by rank ====
For union by rank, a node stores its rank, which is an upper bound for its height. When a node is initialized, its rank is set to zero. To merge trees with roots x and y, first compare their ranks. If the ranks are different, then the larger rank tree becomes the parent, and the ranks of x and y do not change. If the ranks are the same, then either one can become the parent, but the new parent's rank is incremented by one. While the rank of a node is clearly related to its height, storing ranks is more efficient than storing heights. The height of a node can change during a Find operation, so storing ranks avoids the extra effort of keeping the height correct. In pseudocode, union by rank is:

function Union(x, y) is
    // Replace nodes by roots
    x := Find(x)
    y := Find(y)

    if x = y then
        return  // x and y are already in the same set
    end if

    // If necessary, rename variables to ensure that
    // x has rank at least as large as that of y
    if x.rank < y.rank then
        (x, y) := (y, x)
    end if

    // Make x the new root
    y.parent := x
    // If necessary, increment the rank of x
    if x.rank = y.rank then
        x.rank := x.rank + 1
    end if
end function

It can be shown that every node has rank $\lfloor \log n \rfloor$ or less. Consequently, each rank can be stored in O(log log n) bits and all the ranks can be stored in O(n log log n) bits. This makes the ranks an asymptotically negligible portion of the forest's size.

It is clear from the above implementations that the size and rank of a node do not matter unless a node is the root of a tree. Once a node becomes a child, its size and rank are never accessed again.

There is a variant of the Union operation in which the user determines the representative of the formed set. It is not hard to add this functionality to the above algorithms without losing efficiency.

== Time complexity ==
A disjoint-set forest implementation in which Find does not update parent pointers, and in which Union does not attempt to control tree heights, can have trees with height O(n). In such a situation, the Find and Union operations require O(n) time.

If an implementation uses path compression alone, then a sequence of n MakeSet operations, followed by up to n − 1 Union operations and f Find operations, has a worst-case running time of $\Theta(n+f \cdot \left(1 + \log_{2+f/n} n\right))$.

Using union by rank, but without updating parent pointers during Find, gives a running time of $\Theta(m \log n)$ for m operations of any type, up to n of which are MakeSet operations.

The combination of path compression, splitting, or halving, with union by size or by rank, reduces the running time for m operations of any type, up to n of which are MakeSet operations, to $\Theta(m\alpha(n))$. This makes the amortized running time of each operation $\Theta(\alpha(n))$. This is asymptotically optimal, meaning that every disjoint set data structure must use $\Omega(\alpha(n))$ amortized time per operation. Here, the function $\alpha(n)$ is the inverse Ackermann function. The inverse Ackermann function grows extraordinarily slowly, so this factor is 4 or less for any n that can actually be written in the physical universe. This makes disjoint-set operations practically amortized constant time.

=== Proof of O(m log* n) time complexity of Union-Find ===
The precise analysis of the performance of a disjoint-set forest is somewhat intricate. However, there is a much simpler analysis that proves that the amortized time for any m Find or Union operations on a disjoint-set forest containing n objects is O(m log^{*} n), where log^{*} denotes the iterated logarithm.

Lemma 1: As the find function follows the path along to the root, the rank of node it encounters is increasing.

Proof

We claim that as Find and Union operations are applied to the data set, this fact remains true over time. Initially when each node is the root of its own tree, it's trivially true. The only case when the rank of a node might be changed is when the Union by Rank operation is applied. In this case, a tree with smaller rank will be attached to a tree with greater rank, rather than vice versa. And during the find operation, all nodes visited along the path will be attached to the root, which has larger rank than its children, so this operation won't change this fact either.

Lemma 2: A node u which is root of a subtree with rank r has at least $2^r$ nodes.

Proof

Initially when each node is the root of its own tree, it's trivially true. Assume that a node u with rank r has at least 2^{r} nodes. Then when two trees with rank r are merged using the operation Union by Rank, a tree with rank r + 1 results, the root of which has at least $2^r + 2^r = 2^{r + 1}$ nodes.

Lemma 3: The maximum number of nodes of rank r is at most $\frac{n}{2^r}.$

Proof

From lemma 2, we know that a node u which is root of a subtree with rank r has at least $2^r$ nodes. We will get the maximum number of nodes of rank r when each node with rank r is the root of a tree that has exactly $2^r$ nodes. In this case, the number of nodes of rank r is $\frac{n}{2^r}.$

At any particular point in the execution, we can group the vertices of the graph into "buckets", according to their rank. We define the buckets' ranges inductively, as follows: Bucket 0 contains vertices of rank 0. Bucket 1 contains vertices of rank 1. Bucket 2 contains vertices of ranks 2 and 3. In general, if the B-th bucket contains vertices with ranks from interval $\left[r, 2^r - 1\right] = [r, R - 1]$, then the (B+1)st bucket will contain vertices with ranks from interval $\left[R, 2^R - 1\right].$

For $B \in \mathbb{N}$, let $\text{tower}(B) = \underbrace{2^{2^{\cdots^2}}}_{B \text{ times}}$. Then bucket $B$ will have vertices with ranks in the interval $[\text{tower}(B-1), \text{tower}(B)-1]$.

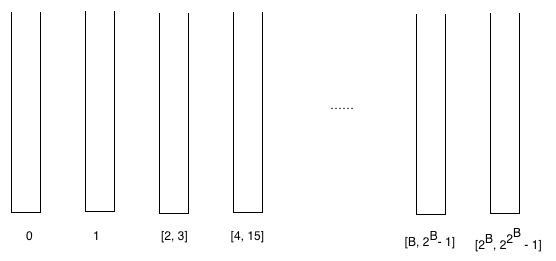
Proof of $O(\log^*n)$ Union Find

We can make two observations about the buckets' sizes.

1. The total number of buckets is at most log^{*}n.
  Proof: Since no vertex can have rank greater than $n$, only the first $\log^* (n)$ buckets can have vertices, where $\log^*$ denotes the inverse of the $\text{tower}$ function defined above.
2. The maximum number of elements in bucket $\left[B, 2^B - 1\right]$ is at most $\frac{2n}{2^B}$.
  Proof: The maximum number of elements in bucket $\left[B, 2^B - 1\right]$ is at most $\frac{n}{2^B} + \frac{n}{2^{B+1}} + \frac{n}{2^{B+2}} + \cdots + \frac{n}{2^{2^B - 1}} \leq \frac{2n}{2^B}.$

Let F represent the list of "find" operations performed, and let

$$T_1 = \sum_F\text{(link to the root)}$$
$$T_2 = \sum_F\text{(number of links traversed where the buckets are different)}$$
$$T_3 = \sum_F\text{(number of links traversed where the buckets are the same).}$$

Then the total cost of m finds is $T = T_1 + T_2 + T_3.$

Since each find operation makes exactly one traversal that leads to a root, we have T_{1} = O(m).

Also, from the bound above on the number of buckets, we have T_{2} = O(mlog^{*}n).

For T_{3}, suppose we are traversing an edge from u to v, where u and v have rank in the bucket [B, 2^{B} − 1] and v is not the root (at the time of this traversing, otherwise the traversal would be accounted for in T_{1}). Fix u and consider the sequence $v_1, v_2, \ldots, v_k$ that take the role of v in different find operations. Because of path compression and not accounting for the edge to a root, this sequence contains only different nodes and because of Lemma 1 we know that the ranks of the nodes in this sequence are strictly increasing. By both of the nodes being in the bucket we can conclude that the length k of the sequence (the number of times node u is attached to a different root in the same bucket) is at most the number of ranks in the buckets B, that is, at most $2^B - 1 - B < 2^B.$

Therefore, $T_3 \leq \sum_{[B, 2^B - 1]} \sum_u 2^B.$

From Observations 1 and 2, we can conclude that $T_3 \leq \sum_{B} 2^B \frac{2n}{2^B} \leq 2 n \log^* n.$

Therefore, $T = T_1 + T_2 + T_3 = O(m \log^*n).$

== Limitations ==
The standard disjoint-set data structure is optimized for merging disjoint sets and determining whether two elements belong to the same set. However, it does not directly support several other types of operations.

=== Deletion and splitting ===
Standard disjoint-set forests do not efficiently support the deletion of individual elements or the splitting of an existing set into multiple sets. In particular, once two sets have been merged, the standard structure does not provide an efficient way to undo the merge. Variants such as rollback disjoint-set data structures can support undoing certain operations, typically by avoiding path compression and using union by size or rank.

=== Graph structure and path queries ===
A disjoint-set data structure maintains information about set membership rather than the underlying graph structure. Its parent pointers represent relationships within the data structure and do not necessarily correspond to edges in the original graph. Consequently, it cannot directly determine the actual path between two vertices, enumerate the vertices of a cycle, or answer tree path queries such as lowest common ancestor (LCA) and path distance queries. Such problems generally require additional graph or tree data structures and algorithms.

=== Path compression and rollback ===
Although path compression improves the amortized time complexity of ordinary disjoint-set operations, it can be inconvenient in applications that require restoring previous states or maintaining multiple versions of the data structure. A single find operation may modify several parent pointers, making these changes more expensive to record and undo. Therefore, rollback and some persistent implementations commonly use union by size or rank without path compression. With union by size or rank alone, the height of the resulting forest is logarithmic in the number of elements.

== Other structures ==
=== Better worst-case time per operation ===
The worst-case time of the Find operation in trees with Union by rank or Union by weight is $\Theta(\log n)$ (i.e., it is $O(\log n)$ and this bound is tight). In 1985, N. Blum gave an implementation of the operations that does not use path compression, but compresses trees during $union$. His implementation runs in $O(\log n / \log\log n)$ time per operation, and thus in comparison with Galler and Fischer's structure it has a better worst-case time per operation, but inferior amortized time. In 1999, Alstrup et al. gave a structure that has optimal worst-case time $O(\log n / \log\log n)$ together with inverse-Ackermann amortized time.

=== Deletion ===
The regular implementation as disjoint-set forests does not react favorably to the deletion of elements, in the sense that the time for Find will not improve as a result of the decrease in the number of elements. However, there exist modern implementations that allow for constant-time deletion and where the time-bound for Find depends on the current number of elements

== Backtracking ==
It is possible to extend certain disjoint-set forest structures to allow backtracking. The basic form of backtracking is to allow a Backtrack(1) operation, that undoes the last Union. A more advanced form allows Backtrack(i), which undoes the last i unions. The following complexity result is known: there is a data structure which supports Union and Find in $O(\log n / \log \log n)$ time per operation, and Backtrack in $O(1)$ time. In this result, the freedom of Union to choose the representative of the formed set is essential. Better amortized time cannot be achieved within the class of separable pointer algorithms.

== Applications ==
A demo for Union-Find when using Kruskal's algorithm to find minimum spanning tree.

Disjoint-set data structures model the partitioning of a set, for example to keep track of the connected components of an undirected graph. This model can then be used to determine whether two vertices belong to the same component—that is, whether adding an edge between them would result in a cycle. The Union–Find algorithm is used in high-performance implementations of unification.

This data structure is used by the Boost Graph Library to implement its Incremental Connected Components functionality. It is also a key component in implementing Kruskal's algorithm to find the minimum spanning tree of a graph.

The Hoshen-Kopelman algorithm uses a Union-Find.

Union-find can be used to implement reasonably performant Type inference algorithms.

== See also ==
- Partition refinement, a different data structure for maintaining disjoint sets, with updates that split sets apart rather than merging them together
- Dynamic connectivity – Data structure that maintains info about the connected components of a graph
