= Jacob Ziv =

Israeli electrical engineer (1931–2023)

- יעקב זיו
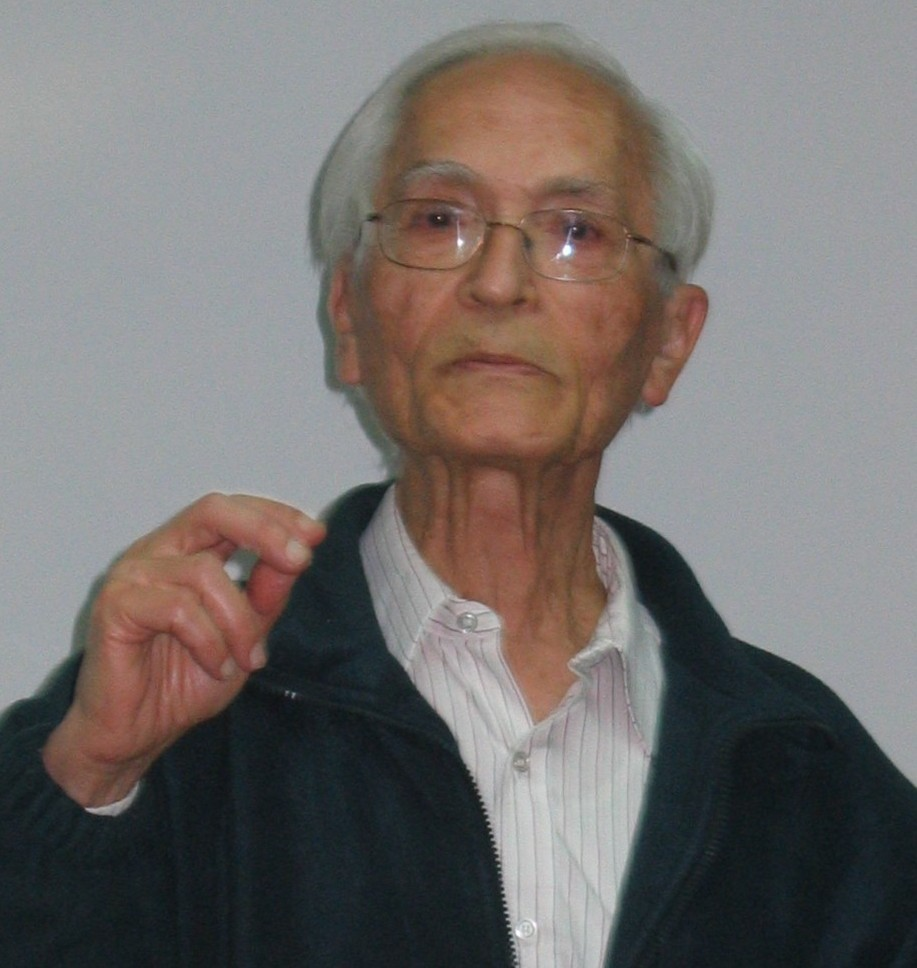
- Born: 27 November 1931; Tiberias, Mandatory Palestine
- Died: 25 March 2023 (aged 91)
- Education: Technion - Israel Institute of Technology (B.Sc., M.Sc.); Massachusetts Institute of Technology (D.Sc.)
- Known for: LZ77, LZ78, Ziv–Zakai bound
- Awards: Israel Prize (1993); IEEE Richard W. Hamming Medal (1995)
- Scientific career
- Fields: Information theory
- Workplaces: Technion - Israel Institute of Technology; Israel Ministry of Defense; Bell Laboratories

Jacob Ziv (Hebrew: יעקב זיו; 27 November 1931 – 25 March 2023) was an Israeli electrical engineer and information theorist who developed the LZ family of lossless data compression algorithms alongside Abraham Lempel. He is also a namesake of the Ziv–Zakai bound in estimation theory, with Moshe Zakai.

== Biography ==
Born in Tiberias, British mandate of Palestine, on 27 November 1931, Ziv received his B.Sc., Dip. Eng. (1954) and M.Sc. degrees (1957) in electrical engineering from the Technion – Israel Institute of Technology, and his D.Sc. degree, receiving the degree from the Massachusetts Institute of Technology in 1962. In 1970, Ziv joined the Technion – Israel Institute of Technology and was the Herman Gross Professor of Electrical Engineering and a Technion Distinguished Professor.

Ziv was dean of the Faculty of Electrical Engineering from 1974 to 1976 and vice president for Academic Affairs from 1978 to 1982. From 1987, Ziv had spent three sabbatical leaves at the Information Research Department of Bell Laboratories in Murray Hill, New Jersey.

From 1955 to 1959, he served as a senior research engineer for the Scientific Department of the Israel Ministry of Defense, focused on research and development of communication systems. While studying for his doctorate at M.I.T. from 1961 to 1962, he joined the Applied Science Division of Melpar, Inc. in Watertown, Massachusetts, where he was a senior research engineer performing research in communication theory. In 1962 he returned to the Israel Ministry of Defense's scientific department, as head of the Communications Division and was also a contributor to the Faculty of Electrical Engineering, Technion – Israel Institute of Technology. From 1968 to 1970 he was one of the technical staff members of Bell Laboratories, Inc., and, from 1985 to 1991, was the chairman of the Israeli Universities Planning and Grants Committee. He was also a member of the Israel Academy of Sciences and Humanities from 1981 to his death, and he served as its president between 1995 and 2004.

Ziv died on 25 March 2023, at age 91.

== Awards ==
In 1993, Ziv was awarded the Israel Prize, for exact sciences. Ziv received in 1995 the IEEE Richard W. Hamming Medal, for "contributions to information theory, and the theory and practice of data compression", and in 1998 a Golden Jubilee Award for Technological Innovation from the IEEE Information Theory Society.

Ziv is the recipient of the 1997 Claude E. Shannon Award from the IEEE Information Theory Society and the 2008 BBVA Foundation Frontiers of Knowledge Award in the category of Information and Communication Technologies. In 2021, Ziv has been awarded the IEEE Medal of Honor, the highest recognition from IEEE, "for fundamental contributions to information theory and data compression technology, and for distinguished research leadership".

Ziv was elected to the American Philosophical Society in 2003 and the National Academy of Sciences in 2004.

== See also ==
- List of Israel Prize recipients

== Lectures ==
- 1992 - Information measures of individual sequences with application to universal data compression and hypothesis testing Lecture sponsored by the Dept. of Electrical and Computer engineering, University of California, San Diego. Electrical and Computer Engineering Distinguished Lecture Series. Digital object made available by UC San Diego Library.
