= Jarosław Duda (computer scientist) =

Polish computer scientist

- Born: Dębica, Poland
- Education: Jagiellonian University
- Known for: asymmetric numeral system (ANS)
- Awards: City of Kraków Award (2021)
- Scientific career
- Fields: computer science, pure mathematics, physics
- Workplaces: Jagiellonian University
- Website: https://th.if.uj.edu.pl/~dudaj/

Jarosław Duda (Polish pronunciation: [jaˈrɔswav ˈduda]), also known as Jarek Duda, is a Polish computer scientist and an assistant professor at the Institute of Computer Science and Computational Mathematics of the Jagiellonian University in Kraków. He is known as the inventor of asymmetric numeral systems (ANS), a family of entropy encoding methods widely used in data compression.

== Life and career ==
He was born in Dębica, Subcarpathian Voivodeship, Poland. In 1999, he graduated from King Władysław Jagiełło High School No. 1 in Dębica. In 2004, he obtained an MSc degree in computer science, in 2005 in pure mathematics, in 2006 in physics, all from the Jagiellonian University in Kraków. In 2010, he obtained a Doctor of Philosophy degree in theoretical computer science, then in 2012 doctorate in theoretical physics from the same university. In 2013, he received a one-year postdoctoral fellowship at the NSF Center for Science of Information of the Purdue University at the invitation from Wojciech Szpankowski. In 2015, he was appointed an assistant professor at the Institute of Computer Science and Computational Mathematics of the Jagiellonian University.

=== Invention of ANS ===
Between 2006 and 2014 he developed a family of entropy coding methods called asymmetric numeral systems, mainly used in data compression, which has become widely used in electronic devices due to improved performance compared to previous methods. ANS combines the compression ratio of arithmetic coding (which uses a nearly accurate probability distribution), with a processing cost similar to that of Huffman coding. In the tabled ANS (tANS) variant, this is achieved by constructing a finite-state machine to operate on a large alphabet without using multiplication. ANS is used in many products of leading technology companies such as Apple, Facebook, Google, and Linux, for example to encode information in Facebook Zstandard, Apple LZFSE, CRAM or JPEG XL popular data compressors.

Duda's intention has been to keep ANS patent-free and available for public use. In 2018, his lobbying helped convince Google to abandon its ANS-related patent claim in the US and Europe. However, in 2022, Microsoft received a US patent covering modifications to a data-encoding technique called rANS, one of several variants in the Asymmetric Numeral System, introduced by Duda in 2013. In an interview with The Register, Duda raised his concerns about the potential diminished utility of ANS as software developers might try to avoid a potential infringement claim.

== Awards ==
In 2021, he became the recipient of the annual City of Kraków Award for his exceptional achievements in computer science.

== See also ==
- List of Polish computer scientists
- Timeline of Polish science and technology
- Timeline of information theory
- List of Polish inventors and discoverers
