= List of Polish inventors and discoverers =

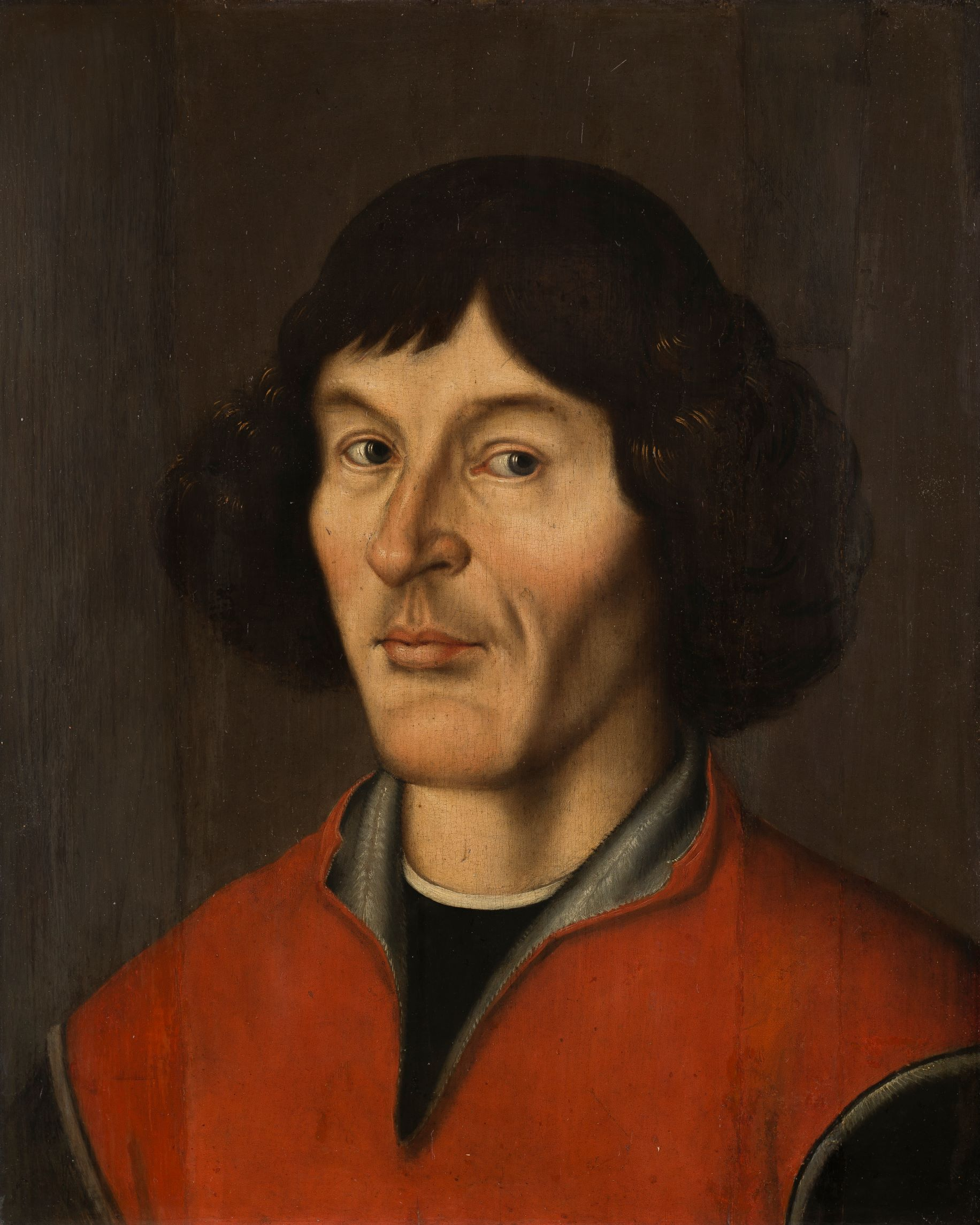
Polish polymath Nicolaus Copernicus (1473–1543) formulated a model of the universe that placed the Sun rather than Earth at its center.

This is a list of Polish inventors and discoverers. The following incomplete list comprises people from Poland and of Polish origin, and also people of predominantly Polish heritage, in alphabetical order of surname.

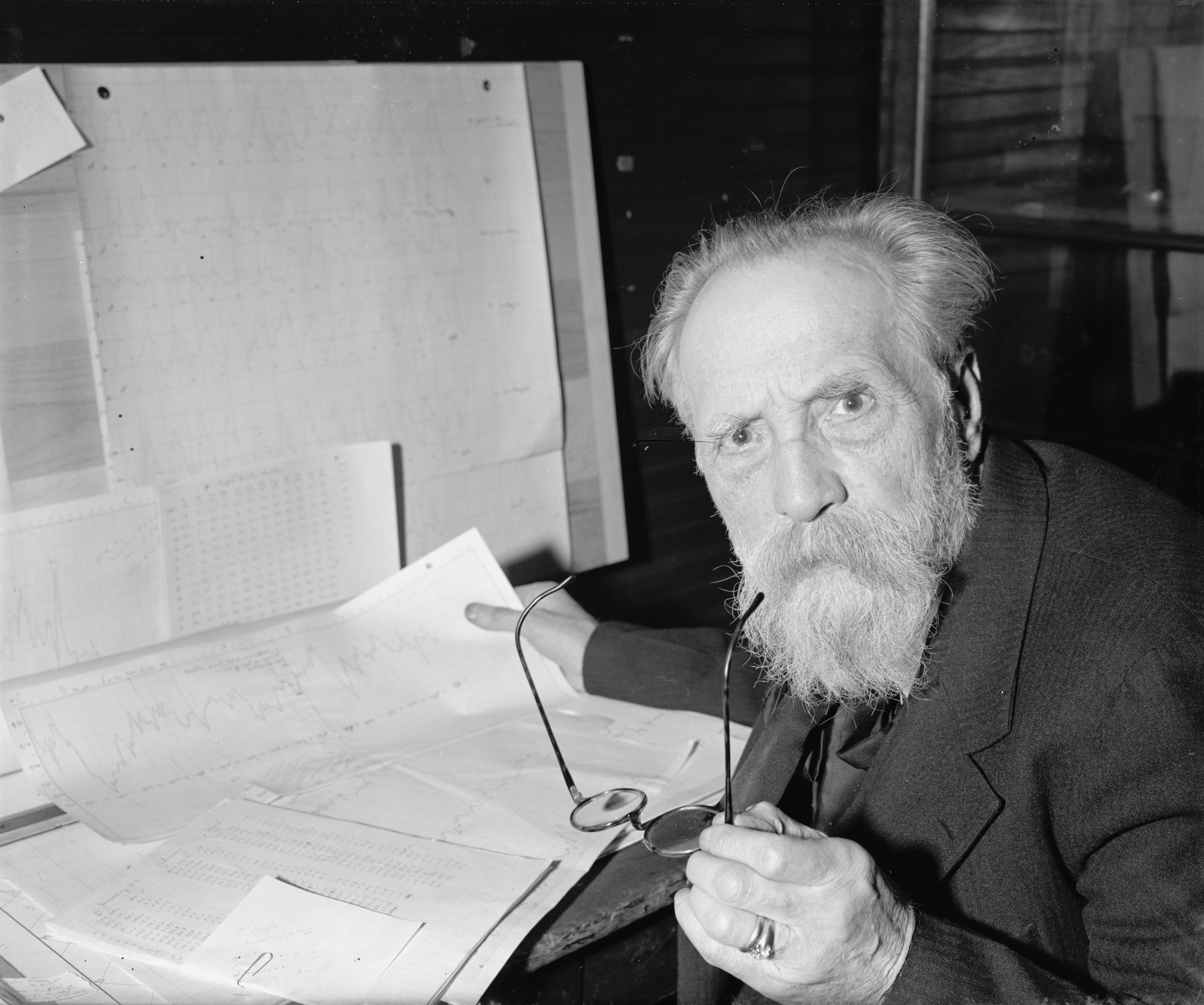
Henryk Arctowski was one of the first people to reach Antarctica during winter.

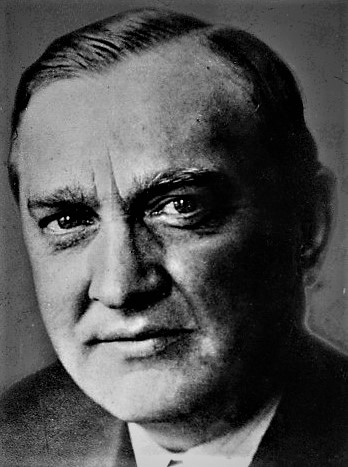
Stefan Banach is considered the founder of modern functional analysis.

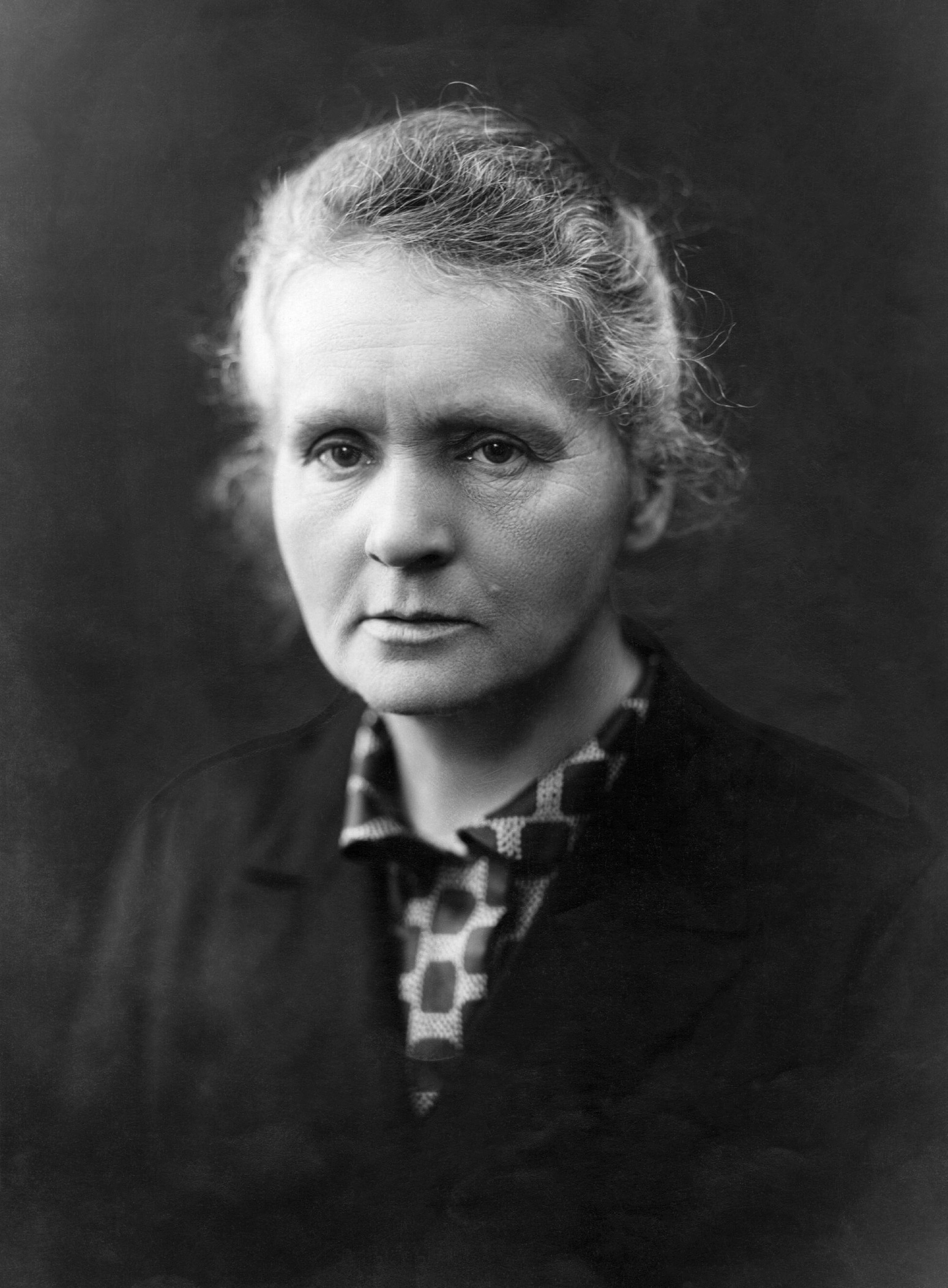
Maria Skłodowska-Curie conducted pioneering research on radioactivity and discovered radium and polonium.

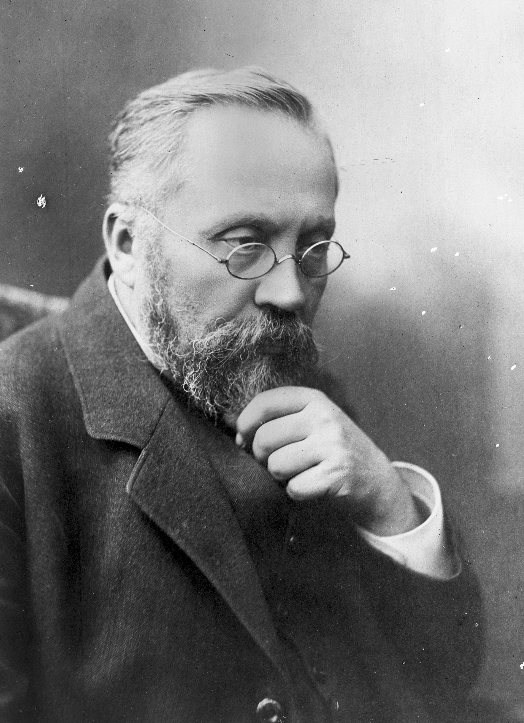
Napoleon Cybulski isolated and identified adrenaline in 1895.

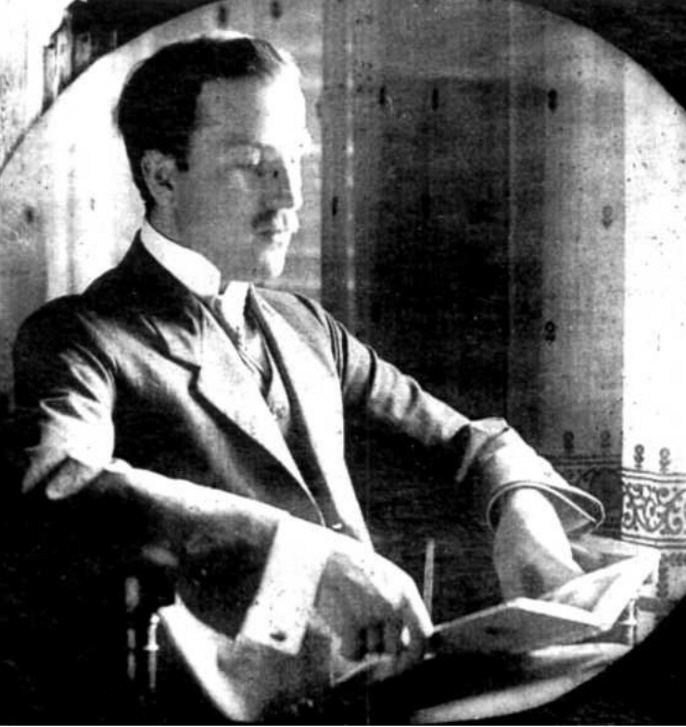
Jan Czochralski is credited with inventing the Czochralski method.

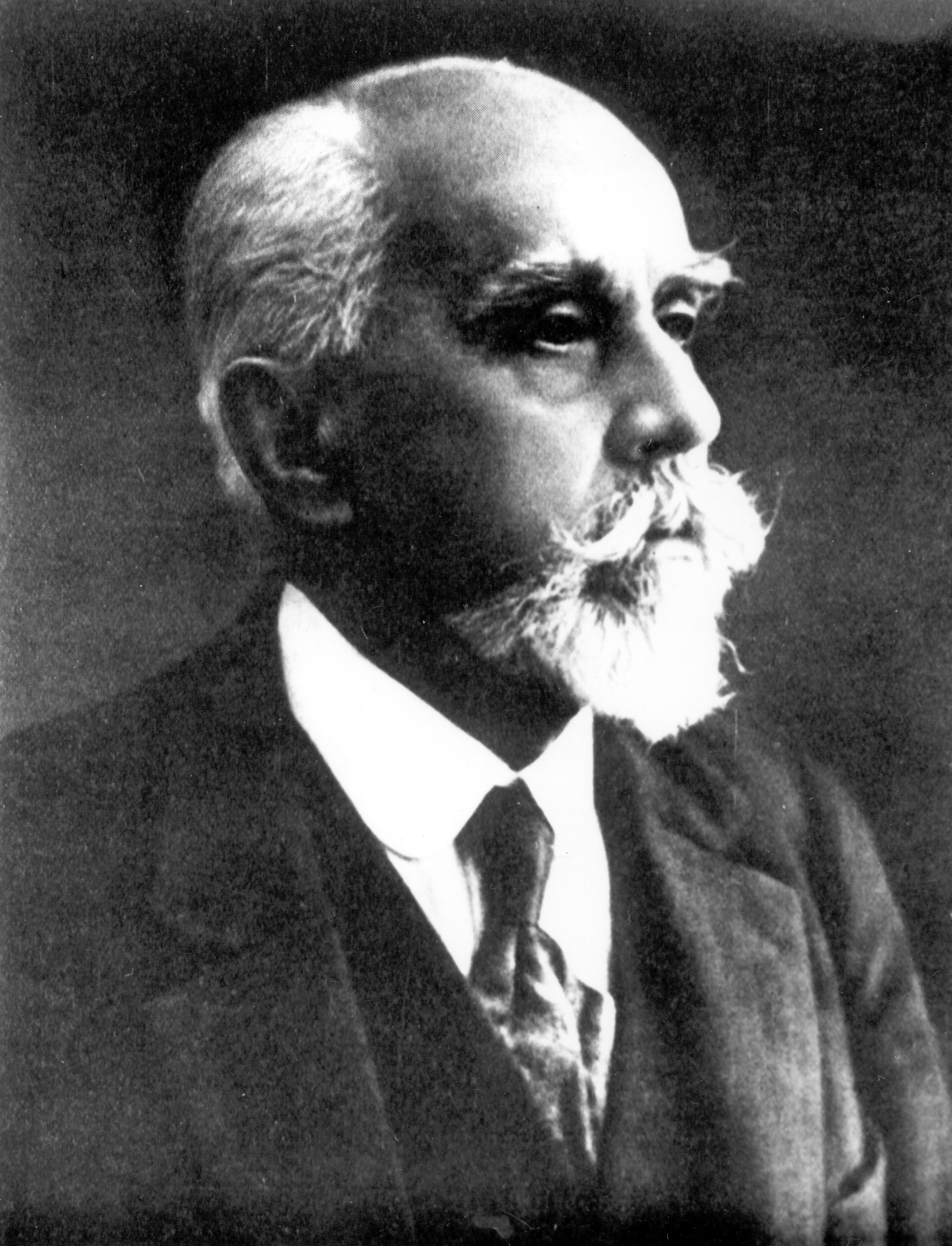
Drzewiecki in 1884 built the first submarine with electric battery-powered propulsion.

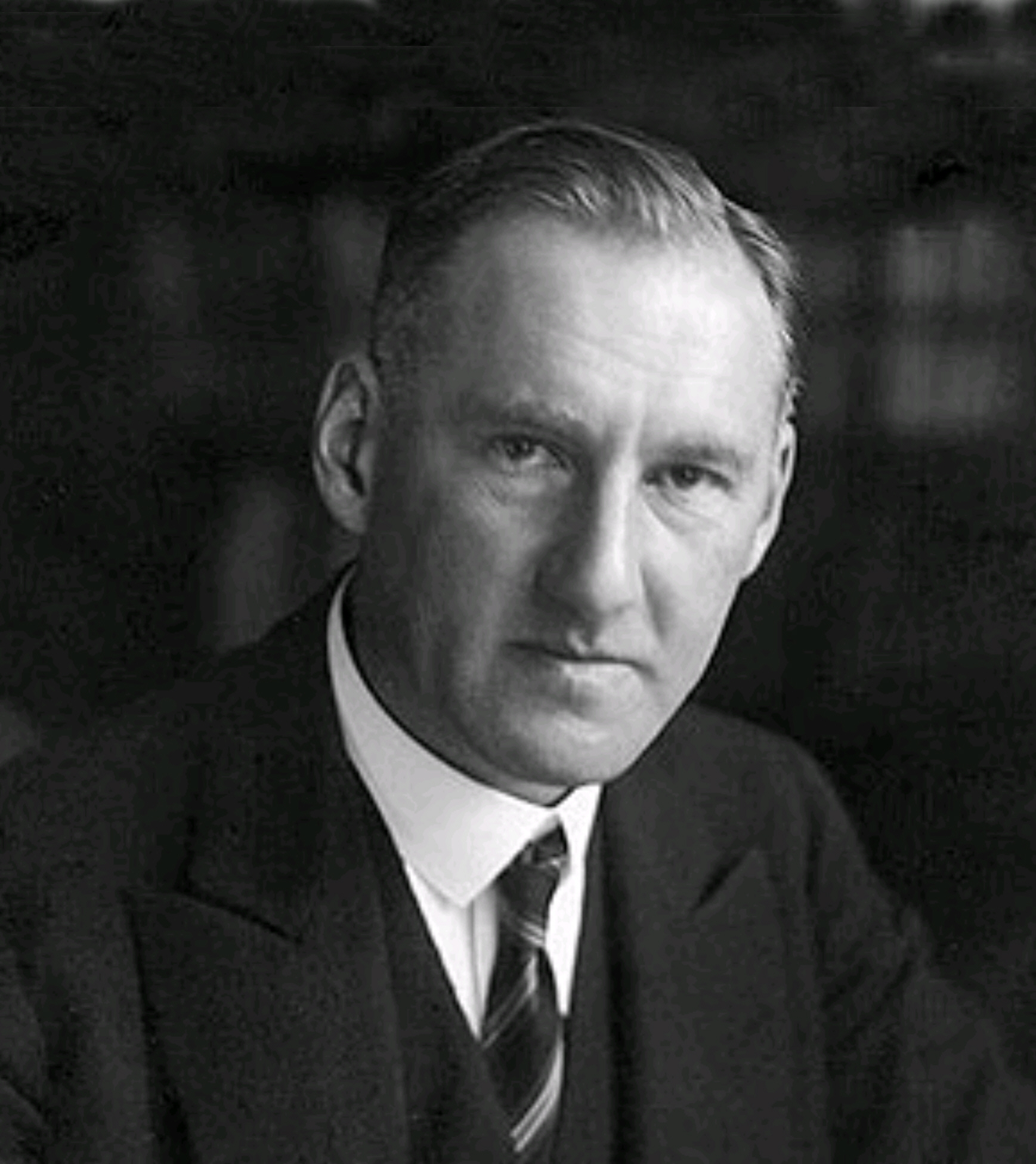
Kazimierz Fajans discovered protactinium in 1913.

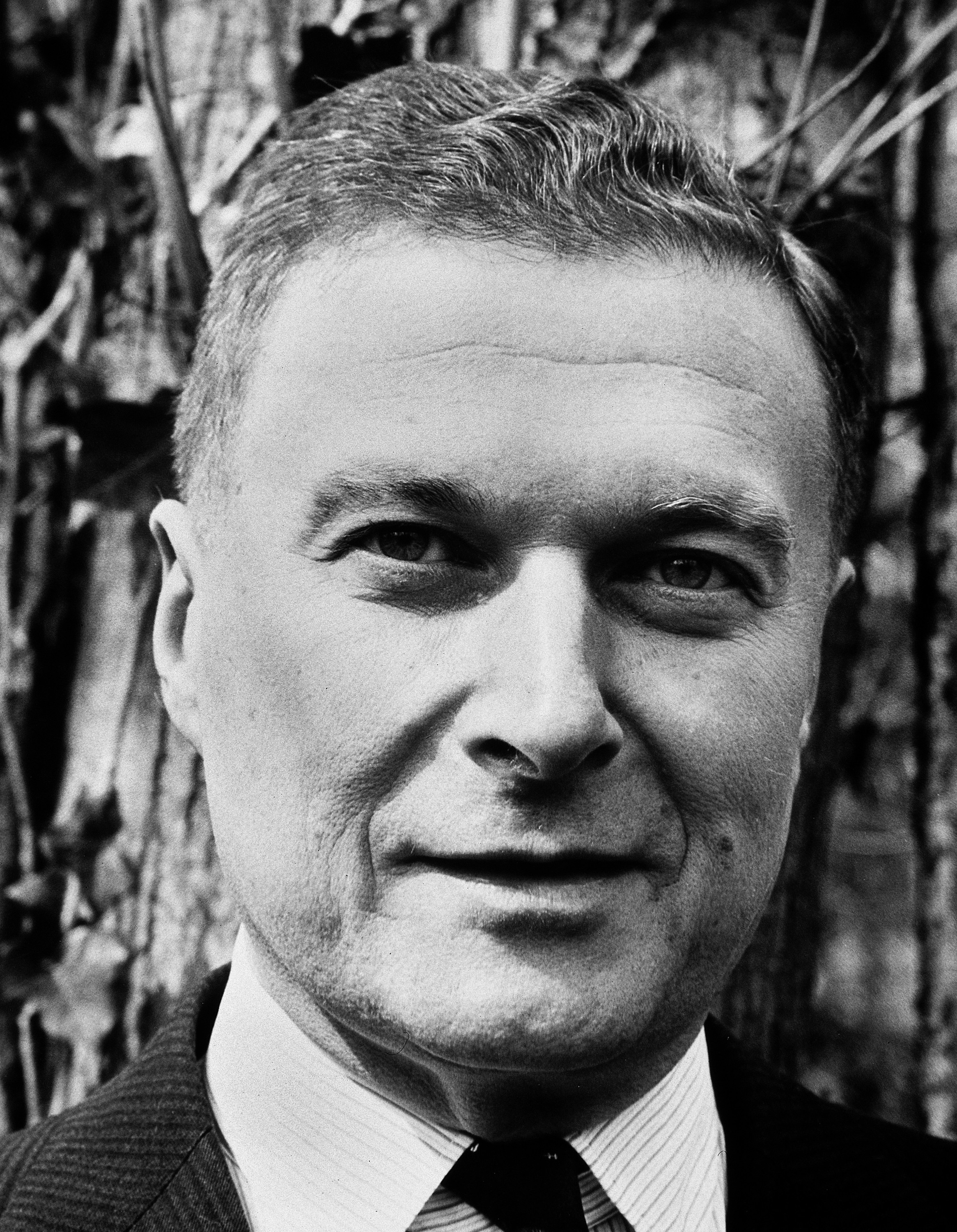
Hilary Koprowski developed the world's first effective live polio vaccine.

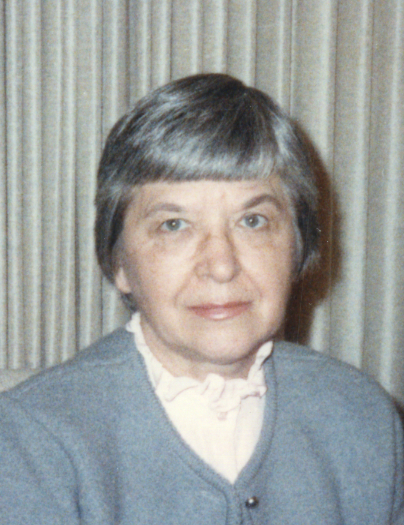
Stephanie Kwolek, inventor of Kevlar

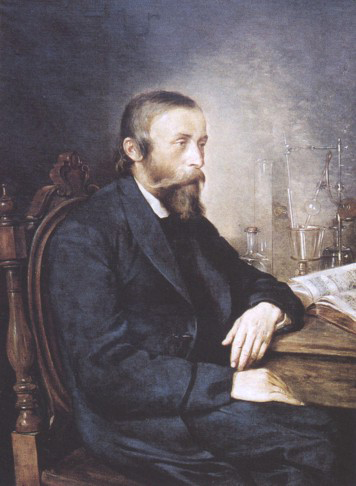
Ignacy Łukasiewicz built world's first oil refinery.

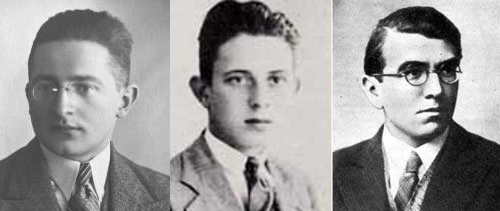
Marian Rejewski, Jerzy Różycki, and Henryk Zygalski, Polish mathematician–cryptologists, broke German Enigma-machine ciphers before and during World War II. Sharing their techniques with the British, they enabled British reading of Enigma messages.

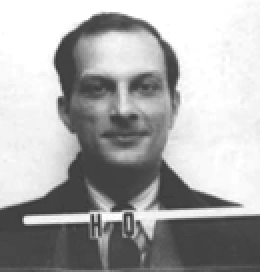
Stanisław Ulam originated the Teller–Ulam design of thermonuclear weapons.

Warner Bros. Entertainment Inc. places itself among the most successful media companies in the world.

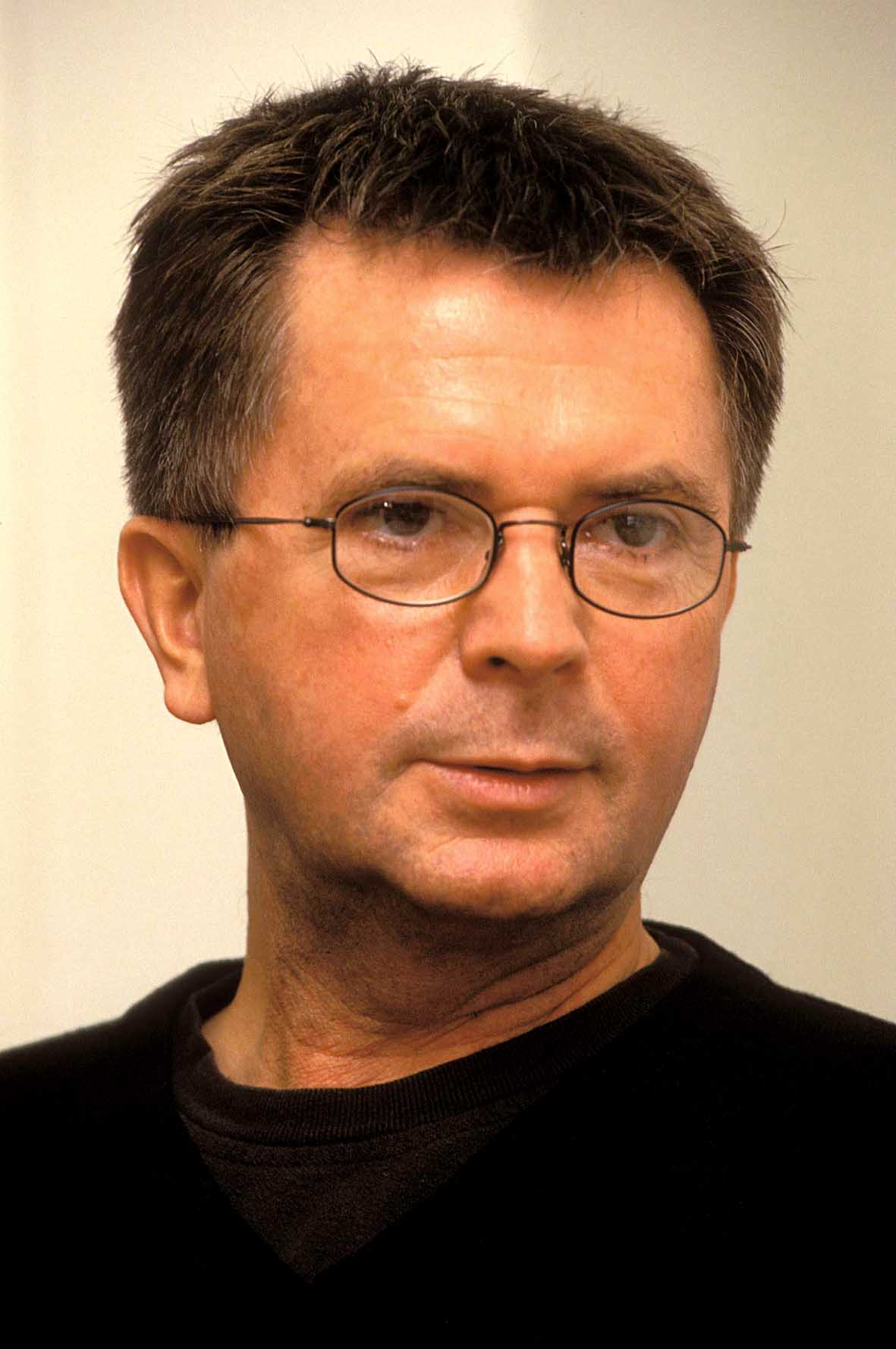
Aleksander Wolszczan discovered the first extrasolar planet, PSR B1257+12.

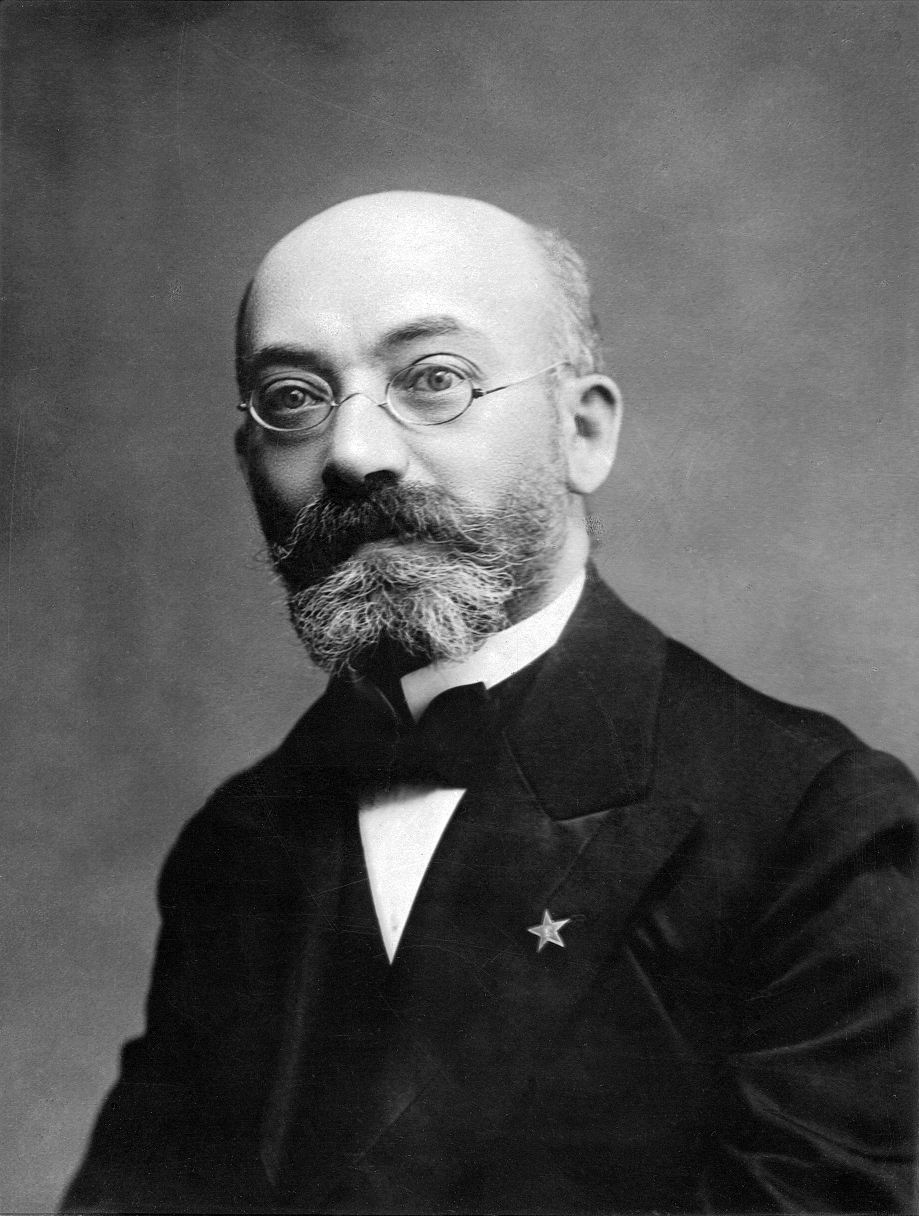
Ludwik Zamenhof took an attempt to create a worldwide-spoken language, resulting in the invention of Esperanto.

== A ==
- Bruno Abakanowicz: invented integrapf, a mechanical analog computing device for plotting the integral of a graphically defined function.
- Osman Achmatowicz Jr.: specialist in the field of organic chemistry. Inventor of the Achmatowicz reaction.
- Karol Adamiecki: management theorist. Together with Frederick Winslow Taylor and Henry Fayola the creator of organisation and management science. In 1925 Adamiecki founded the Polish Institute of Scientific Management.
- Albert Wojciech Adamkiewicz: pathologist. His research of the variable vascularity of the spinal cord was an important contribution to the development of modern clinical vascular surgery. He is known for Artery of Adamkiewicz and Adamkiewicz reaction.
- Henryk Arctowski: scientist and explorer. Living in exile for a large part of his life, he was one of the first persons to reach Antarctica during winter and became an internationally renowned meteorologist.

== B ==
- Joseph Babinski: neurologist, discoverer of the Babinski reflex.
- Stefan Banach: considered one of the world's most important and influential 20th-century mathematicians, creator of Banach space. He was one of the founders of modern functional analysis, and an original member of the Lwów School of Mathematics. His major work was the 1932 book, Théorie des opérations linéaires (Theory of Linear Operations), the first monograph on the general theory of functional analysis.
- Feliks Barański: pioneer and the specialist in the field of Differential equations.
- Jan Józef Baranowski: took part in the Great Emigration. Invented Railway signal device, ticket machine and gas meter.
- Mieczysław G. Bekker: co-authored the general idea and vitally contributed to the design and construction of the Lunar Roving Vehicle (LRV) used by NASA in missions Apollo 15, Apollo 16, and Apollo 17 on the Moon. He was the author of several patented inventions in the area of off-the-road vehicles, including those for extraterrestrial use.
- Benedict of Poland: Polish Franciscan friar, explorer, and interpreter, participant of the pioneering European trip to the capital of the Mongol Empire in the 13th century.
- Edmund Biernacki: physician, the first one to note a relationship between the sedimentation rate of red blood cells in a human blood sample and the general condition of the organism. This method is now known as the Biernacki Reaction.
- Michał Borysiekiewicz: invented the first "electronic eye" for blind people.
- Michał Boym: 17th-century Jesuit missionary, scientist and explorer, who was the first in Europe to describe Korea as a peninsula, as until then it was believed to be an island, and the first in Europe to establish the factual location of a number of Chinese cities and the Great Wall of China.
- Josef Božek: managed to put into operation one of the first steam engines in the Czech lands.
- Stefan Bryła: designed and built the first welded road bridge in the world.
- Janusz Brzozowski: computer scientist known for developing the Brzozowski derivative and Brzozowski's algorithm.
- Tytus Liwiusz Burattini: inventor of the micrometer.

== C ==
- Maria Skłodowska-Curie: conducted pioneering research on radioactivity. She was the first woman to win a Nobel Prize, the first person and only woman to win twice, the only person to win a Nobel Prize in two different sciences – physics and chemistry. She was also the first woman to become a professor at the University of Paris, and in 1995 became the first woman to be entombed on her own merits in the Panthéon in Paris.
- Nicolaus Copernicus (Mikołaj Kopernik): mathematician, physician, translator, diplomat. Most commonly known as an astronomer who formulated a model of the universe that placed the Sun rather than the Earth at the center of the universe included in his work De revolutionibus orbium coelestium (On the Revolutions of the Heavenly Spheres).
- Napoleon Cybulski:, physiologist, discoverer of adrenaline, one of pioneers of endocrinology and electroencephalography.
- Jan Czochralski: chemist, invented the Czochralski process, commonly used for growing crystals and in the production of semiconductor wafers.

== D ==
- Marian Danysz: physicist, co-discovered the hypernucleus.
- Kazimierz Dąbrowski: psychologist, psychiatrist, and physician, author of the theory of "positive disintegration".
- Henryk Derczyński: a photographer, created an isohelia technology, a technique that sharpens contrasts and defines three-dimensional images.
- Stefan Drzewiecki: engineer and inventor, built the first submarine in the world with electric battery-powered propulsion.
- Jarosław Duda: computer scientist, a graduate of Jagiellonian University and inventor of Asymmetric numeral systems (ANS), a family of entropy encoding methods widely used in data compression.
- Jan Dzierżon: apiarist who discovered the phenomenon of parthenogenesis in bees and designed the first successful movable-frame beehive (1838).

== E ==
- Artur Ekert: physicist; one of the pioneers of quantum cryptography.

== F ==
- Maksymilian Faktorowicz: founder of the Max Factor cosmetics company, popularized the term "make-up", had perfected the first cosmetic specifically created for motion picture use—a thinner greasepaint in cream form and largely developed the modern cosmetics industry in the United States.
- Kazimierz Fajans: physical chemist, pioneer in the science of radioactivity and the discoverer of chemical element protactinium.
- Edward Flatau: neurologist.
- Julius Fromm: chemist, entrepreneur, one of the inventors of the rubber condom.
- Casimir Funk:, biochemist, the first to formulate (1912) the concept and the term of vitamins originally calling them "vital amins"/"vit- amins" discovered first vitamins, i.e B1

== G ==
- Leo Gerstenzang: Polish-American inventor who in 1923 created the first contemporary cotton swab or Q-Tips.
- Ludwik Gross: virologist. He discovered two different tumor viruses — murine leukemia virus and mouse polyomavirus — capable of causing cancers in laboratory mice.
- Ryszard Gryglewski: physician and pharmacologist. He co-discovered prostacyclin (1976), which set off many further scientific discoveries.
- Andrzej Grzegorczyk: mathematician and logician, who introduced the Grzegorczyk hierarchy, a hierarchy of functions used in computability theory.
- Rudolf Gundlach: military engineer, inventor and tank designer, inventor of the Vickers Tank Periscope MK.IV also known as the Gundlach Periscope.

== H ==
- Józef Hofmann: musician, invented Paper clips.
- Johannes Hevelius: astronomer who gained a reputation as "the founder of lunar topography", and described ten new constellations, seven of which are still used by astronomers.

== J ==
- Ania Bleszynski Jayich: experimental physicist known for precision measurement, novel sensors and applications, and hybrid quantum systems.
- Stefania Jabłońska: physician; in 1972 Jabłońska proposed the association of the human papilloma viruses with skin cancer in epidermodysplasia verruciformis; in 1978 Jabłońska and Gerard Orth discovered HPV-5 in skin cancer; Jabłońska was awarded the 1985 Robert Koch Prize.
- Wojciech Jastrzębowski: scientist, naturalist and inventor, one of the fathers of ergonomics.
- Walery Jaworski: one of the pioneers of gastroenterology in Poland who made one of the first observations of Helicobacter pylori and published those findings in 1899 in a book titled Podręcznik chorób żołądka (Handbook of Gastric Diseases).

== K ==
- Jacek Karpiński: pioneer in computer engineering and computer science. He became a developer of one of the first machine learning algorithms, techniques for character and image recognition. In 1971, he designed one of the first minicomputers, the K-202.
- Adam Adamandy Kochański: mathematician, physicist, clockmaker, who found an approximation of π today called the Kochański's Approximation. He also suggested replacing the clock's pendulum with a spring, constructed a clock with a magnetic pendulum, and was the author of the world's first systematic paper on the construction of clocks.
- Jerzy Konorski: neurophysiologist, discoverer of secondary conditioned reflexes and operant conditioning. He also proposed the idea of gnostic neurons, a concept similar to the grandmother cell. He coined the term neural plasticity.
- Hilary Koprowski: virologist and immunologist, who developed the world's first effective live polio vaccine.
- Kazimierz Kordylewski: astronomer, discoverer of the Kordylewski clouds.
- Józef Kosacki: invented the Polish mine detector, a first man-portable device used by the allied forces during the World War II.
- Tadeusz Kościuszko: Polish, Lithuanian, Belarusian and American war hero and military leader, military engineer, colonel in the Continental Army during the American Revolutionary War, creator of the West Point state-of-the-art Fortifications, prepared a national Kosciuszko Uprising in Poland against the Russian Empire and acted as the Supreme Commander.
- Tadeusz Krwawicz: ophthalmologist who pioneered the use of cryosurgery in ophthalmology.
- Stefan Kudelski: audio engineer known for creating the Nagra series of professional audio recorders later sold to British BBC, American stations NBC, ABC, CBS, but also plenty of radio stations including famous Radio Luxembourg. Kudelski received prestigious Oscar Awards in 1965, 1977, 1978, and 1990. He also won two Emmy Awards in 1984 and 1986.
- Jerzy Kukuczka: alpinist, the second man in history to climb all fourteen Eight-thousanders including three as first ascents, established a new route on K2 in alpine style called the "Polish line".
- Wojciech Kurtyka: mountaineer, alpinist, one of the alpine style climbing pioneers, after climbing through the "Shining Wall" on Gasherbrum IV the Climbing magazine declared beat the wall to get the greatest achievement of mountaineering in the twentieth century.
- Stephanie Kwolek (1923–2014): American chemist of Polish origin, inventor of Kevlar.

== L, Ł ==
- Ignacy Łukasiewicz: invented kerosene lamp, designed and built both world's first oil refinery and oil well. Introduced the first modern street lamp in Europe.
- Jan Łukasiewicz: invented RPN (Reverse Polish Notation) used in professional Calculators as well as by Computers in order to determine the order of mathematical operations without using parentheses.

== M ==
- Ernest Malinowski: civil engineer best known for constructing the Ferrocarril Central Andino in the Peruvian Andes, the world's highest railway at the time.
- Henryk Manguski: a telecommunications engineer who worked for Motorola in Chicago. He was the inventor of the first Walkie-Talkies and one of the authors of his company success in the fields of radio communication.
- Benoit Mandelbrot: mathematician of Polish descent, known for developing a theory of "roughness and self-similarity" and significant contributions to fractal geometry and chaos theory; Mandelbrot set.
- Krzysztof Matyjaszewski: chemist, who discovered atom transfer radical polymerization (ATRP).
- Jan Mikulicz-Radecki: surgeon, inventor of new operating techniques and tools, one of the pioneers of antiseptics and aseptic techniques. He is also the inventor of surgical mask.
- Ludwik Młokosiewicz: explorer, zoologist and botanist, who discovered 60 species of plants and animals in Georgia and the Caucasus.
- Aleksander Możajski: Polish-Russian military officer, built world's first plane.

== N ==
- Jan Nagórski: engineer and pioneer of aviation, the first person to fly an airplane in the Arctic and the first aviator to perform a loop with a flying boat.

== O ==
- Karol Olszewski: chemist, the first (alongside Zygmunt Wróblewski) to liquefy oxygen, nitrogen and carbon dioxide from the atmosphere in a stable state (not, as had been the case up to then, in a dynamic state in the transitional form as vapour) (1833).
- Stanisław Olszewski: engineer and inventor, co-creator of modern electric arc welding.

== P ==
- Bohdan Paczyński: astronomer, credited with the development of a new method of detecting space objects and establishing their mass using the gravitational lenses effect.
- Antoni Patek: pioneer in watchmaking and the creator of the Patek Philippe & Co.
- Janusz Pawliszyn: chemist, inventor of solid-phase microextraction (SPME).
- Jerzy Pniewski: physicist, co-discovered the hypernucleus.
- Kazimierz Pułaski: Polish nobleman, soldier and military strategist, a general in the Continental Army during the American Revolutionary War, the creator and the head of the Pulaski Cavalry Legion and reformer of the American cavalry. He distinguished himself throughout the revolution, most notably when he saved the life of George Washington. One of only eight people in the history to be awarded honorary United States citizenship.
- Kazimierz Prószyński: patented the first film camera, the Pleograph, before the Lumière brothers, and later went on to improve the cinema projector for the Gaumont company, as well as invent the widely used hand-held Aeroscope camera.
- Antoni Przybylski: Polish-Australian astronomer best known for discovering Przybylski's Star.

== R ==
- Tadeusz Reichstein: Polish-Swiss chemist and the Nobel Prize in Physiology or Medicine laureate (1950), who was awarded for his work on the isolation of cortisone.
- Zbigniew Religa: a pioneer in human heart transplantation in Poland, he led the team that performed the first successful heart transplantation in the country, and in June 1995 he was the first surgeon to graft an artificial valve created from materials taken from human corpses.
- Marian Rejewski: mathematician and cryptologist who reconstructed the sight-unseen German military Enigma cipher machine.
- Jerzy Rudlicki: aerospace engineer and pilot. He is best known for his inventing and patenting of the V-tail in 1930, which is an aircraft tail configuration that combines the rudder and elevators into one system.
- Ludwik Rydygier: surgeon, who performed the first in Poland and second in the world successful surgical removal of the pylorus in a patient suffering from stomach cancer, and the first peptic ulcer resection in the world.

== S ==
- Andrew Schally: endocrinologist and Nobel Prize laureate (1977) whose research contributed to the discovery that the hypothalamus controls hormone production and release by the pituitary gland, which controls the regulation of other hormones in the body.
- Michael Sendivogius: pioneer of chemistry, who developed ways of purification and creation of various acids, metals and other chemical compounds, and discovered that air is not a single substance and contains a life-giving substance—later called oxygen.
- Tadeusz Sendzimir: metallurgist, revolutionised galvanisation and rolling process.
- Kazimierz Siemienowicz: military engineer, one of pioneers of rocketry, author of Artis Magnae Artilleriae pars prima, a work that served as the principal artillery manual in Europe from the mid-16th to the mid-18th centuries, also containing the first printed design of a multistage rocket.
- Maria Siemionow: transplant surgeon and scientist who led a team of eight surgeons through the world's first near-total face transplant.
- Hugo Steinhaus: mathematician, specialist in the field of functional analysis.
- Abraham Stern: inventor of the mechanical calculator, topography machine, agriculture machines.
- Josephus Struthius: professor of medicine and personal doctor of Polish kings, who was among the first to provide a visual representation of the human pulse and used it for diagnostic purposes.
- Paweł Edmund Strzelecki: explorer most commonly known for his early explorations of Australia, particularly the Snowy Mountains and Tasmania. Climbed and named the highest Australian peak – Mount Kosciuszko.
- Jan Szczepanik: inventor, with several hundred patents and over 50 discoveries to his name; his inventions founded ground for radio and TV broadcasting.
- Wacław Szybalski: medical researcher, geneticist and oncologist. He conducted research on drug resistance and molecular genetics and is known for the Szybalski's rule.

== Ś ==
- Jędrzej Śniadecki: writer, physician, chemist, biologist and philosopher. He was the first person who linked rickets to lack of sunlight (1822). He also created modern Polish terminology in the field of chemistry.
- Władysław Świątecki: physicist noted for pioneering research in nuclear physics including the nuclear shell model and for independently predicting the existence of the so-called island of stability.

== T ==
- Władysław Tryliński: transportation engineer who invented trylinka, the hexagonal concrete block widely used in the construction of roads in Poland due to its low cost and durability, becoming a synonym for sidewalks made of them.
- Jacek Trzmiel: was a Polish American businessman, best known for founding Commodore International. Tramiel later formed Atari Corporation after he purchased the remnants of the original Atari, Inc. from its parent company.
- Abraham Icek Tuszyński: entrepreneur, founder of the most prestigious movie theater in the Netherlands – the Tuschinski Theater in Amsterdam.

== U ==
- Stanisław Ulam was a mathematician of the Lwów School of Mathematics and a member of the Manhattan Project. He was assigned to Edward Teller's group, where he worked on Teller's "Super" bomb for Teller and Enrico Fermi. With the aid of a cadre of female "computers", including his wife Françoise Aron Ulam, he found that Teller's "Super" design was unworkable. In January 1951, Ulam and Teller came up with the Teller–Ulam design, which is the basis for all thermonuclear weapons. Ulam discovered the concept of the cellular automaton, invented the Monte Carlo method of computation, and suggested nuclear pulse propulsion. In pure and applied mathematics, he proved some theorems and proposed several conjectures.

== W ==
- Warner Brothers (Bracia Wonsal): American-naturalized brothers of Polish-Jewish origin, created the Warner Bros. Entertainment Inc., one of the biggest and most successful media corporations in the world being one of the "Big Six" American film studios.
- Rudolf Weigl: biologist, physician and inventor, known for creating the first effective vaccine against epidemic typhus.
- Krzysztof Wielicki: regarded as one of the greatest mountaineers in history. He performed the first winter ascents on Mount Everest, Kangchenjunga, and Lhotse.
- Anna Wierzbicka: linguist; known for her work in semantics, pragmatics and cross-cultural linguistics; she's credited with formulating the theory of natural semantic metalanguage and the concept of semantic primes.
- Mieczysław Wolfke: the forerunner of holography and television.
- Zygmunt Wróblewski: chemist: the first (alongside Karol Olszewski) to liquefy oxygen, nitrogen and carbon dioxide from the atmosphere in a stable state (not, as had been the case up to then, in a dynamic state in the transitional form as vapour) (1833).

== Z ==
- Ludwik Zamenhof: creator of Esperanto, the most successful constructed language in the world.
- Casimir Zeglen, inventor of one of the first bulletproof vests.
- Witold Zglenicki: geologist and inventor. Pioneer of oil extraction from sea bottom.

== See also ==
- List of Poles
- List of Polish Nobel laureates
- Timeline of Polish science and technology
