= Jarosław Duda =

Jarosław Duda may refer to:

- Jarosław Duda (computer scientist), Polish computer scientist
- Jarosław Duda (politician) (born 1964), Polish politician
