= Stanisław Konturek =

Polish physiologist and gastroenterologist (1931–2019)

Stanisław Jan Konturek
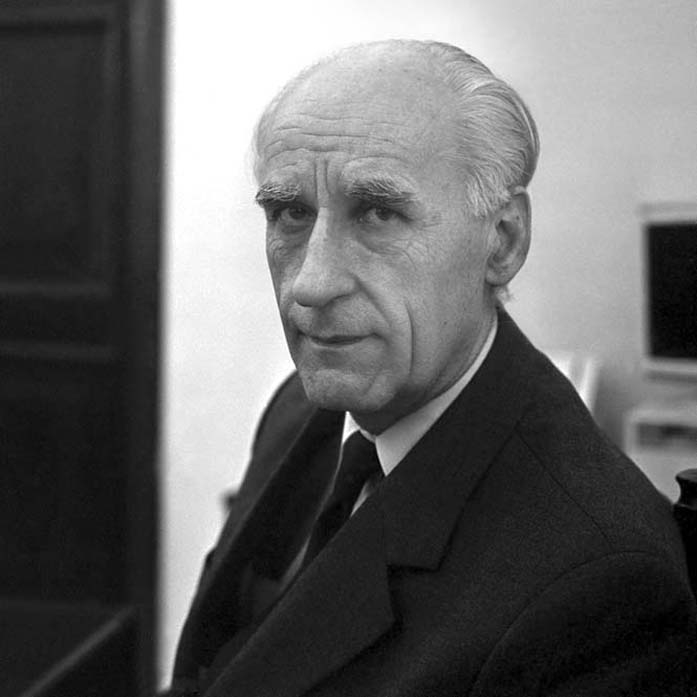
- Born: 8 October 1931; Zakliczyn
- Died: 8 August 2019 (aged 87)
- Citizenship: Polish
- Occupations: Physiologist; gastroenterologist

Stanisław Jan Konturek (8 October 1931 – 8 August 2019) was a Polish physiologist and gastroenterologist, a member of the Polish Academy of Sciences and the Polish Academy of Learning, and professor of Jagiellonian University Collegium Medicum.

He was buried at the Rakowicki Cemetery.

== Honors and awards ==
- Gold Cross of Merit (1974)
- Knight's Cross of Polonia Restituta (1982)
- Prize of the Foundation for Polish Science (1995)
- Honorary degree of Medical University of Białystok (1995)
- City of Kraków Award (1997)
- Honorary degree of Wrocław Medical University (1998)
- Officer's Cross of Polonia Restituta (2001)
- Honorary degree of Warsaw University of Life Sciences (2008)
- Honorary degree of Medical University of Łódź (2008)
- Commander's Cross of the Order of Polonia Restituta (2018)
