= Zoo (file format) =

zoo
- Filename extension: .zoo
- Internet media type: application/x-zoo
- Type of format: data compression

zoo is a data compression program and format developed by Rahul Dhesi in the mid-1980s. The format is based on the LZSS compression algorithm and compressed files are identified by the .zoo file extension. It is no longer widely used. Program source code was originally published on the comp.sources.misc Usenet newsgroup, and was compatible with a variety of Unix-like operating systems. Binaries were also published for the MS-DOS and AmigaOS user communities.

== zoo features ==
zoo archives can store multiple "generations" of a file; if files are added to an archive with the same pathname yet more recent date, if generations are enabled for the archive the older version(s) will be retained (with a semicolon and version number, similar to version numbers in the VMS and RT-11 operating systems) as the new file is added. This allows files that are frequently modified to be backed up in such a way as to allow access to previous versions (up to the version limit chosen) from one archive.
