= City of Kraków Award =

The City of Kraków Award is an award bestowed annually by the President of Kraków, Poland, for contributions relating to the city, and the popularization of its culture at home and abroad. It is given to prominent artists in the field of theatre, music, plastic arts and film, as well as to scholars and athletes. The applications can be submitted by the city cultural committee itself, as well as by art colleges, unions of art professionals, cultural institutions and publishers.

Applications for an award cannot be submitted by individuals. Among the institutions eligible to submit them are universities, arts and cultural organizations, the City Council committees, and sports associations, depending on the nomination category in which they are requested.

== Recipients ==
- Józef Baran
- Jan Błoński
- Leszek Długosz
- Jarosław Duda
- Marian Dziędziel (2015)
- Jerzy Fedorowicz
- Józef Andrzej Gierowski
- Krzysztof Globisz
- Zygmunt Konieczny
- Stanisław Konturek
- Julian Kornhauser
- Robert Korzeniowski
- Mariusz Kwiecień
- Ewa Lipska
- Bronisław Maj (2015)
- Krzysztof Meyer
- Andrzej Mleczko
- Krystyna Moszumańska-Nazar
- Jan Nowicki
- Jerzy Nowosielski
- Wiesław Ochman
- Joanna Olczak-Ronikier (2015)
- Jan Ostrowski (2010)
- Maria Pawlikowska-Jasnorzewska
- Krzysztof Penderecki
- Franciszek Pieczka
- Anna Polony
- Zbigniew Preisner
- Dorota Segda
- Marek Stachowski
- Jerzy Stuhr
- Anna Świrszczyńska
- Jerzy Trela
- Marcin Urbaś
- Jan Woleński
- Adam Zagajewski
- Maciej Żurawski
- Zdzisław Żygulski (art historian)
