= Medical University of Lublin =

Coordinates: 51°14′53.97″N 22°32′55.82″E

- Uniwersytet Medyczny w Lublinie
- Latin: Universitas Medica Lublinensis
- Type: Public
- Established: 1950
- Affiliations: Erasmus Programme
- Rector: Prof. dr hab. n. med. Wojciech Załuska
- Students: 6,912 (12.2023)
- Location: Lublin, Poland
- Website: www.umlub.pl

The Medical University of Lublin dates back to 1944 in Lublin, Poland. The university gained its autonomy in 1950. Over the years, new departments were added such as the Department of Dentistry in 1973.

The university maintains lively international scientific contacts in cooperation with Hvidovre Hospital in Copenhagen, Denmark; Ziekenhuis-Tilburg Hospital (Netherlands), and Lviv Medical University in Ukraine, among others.

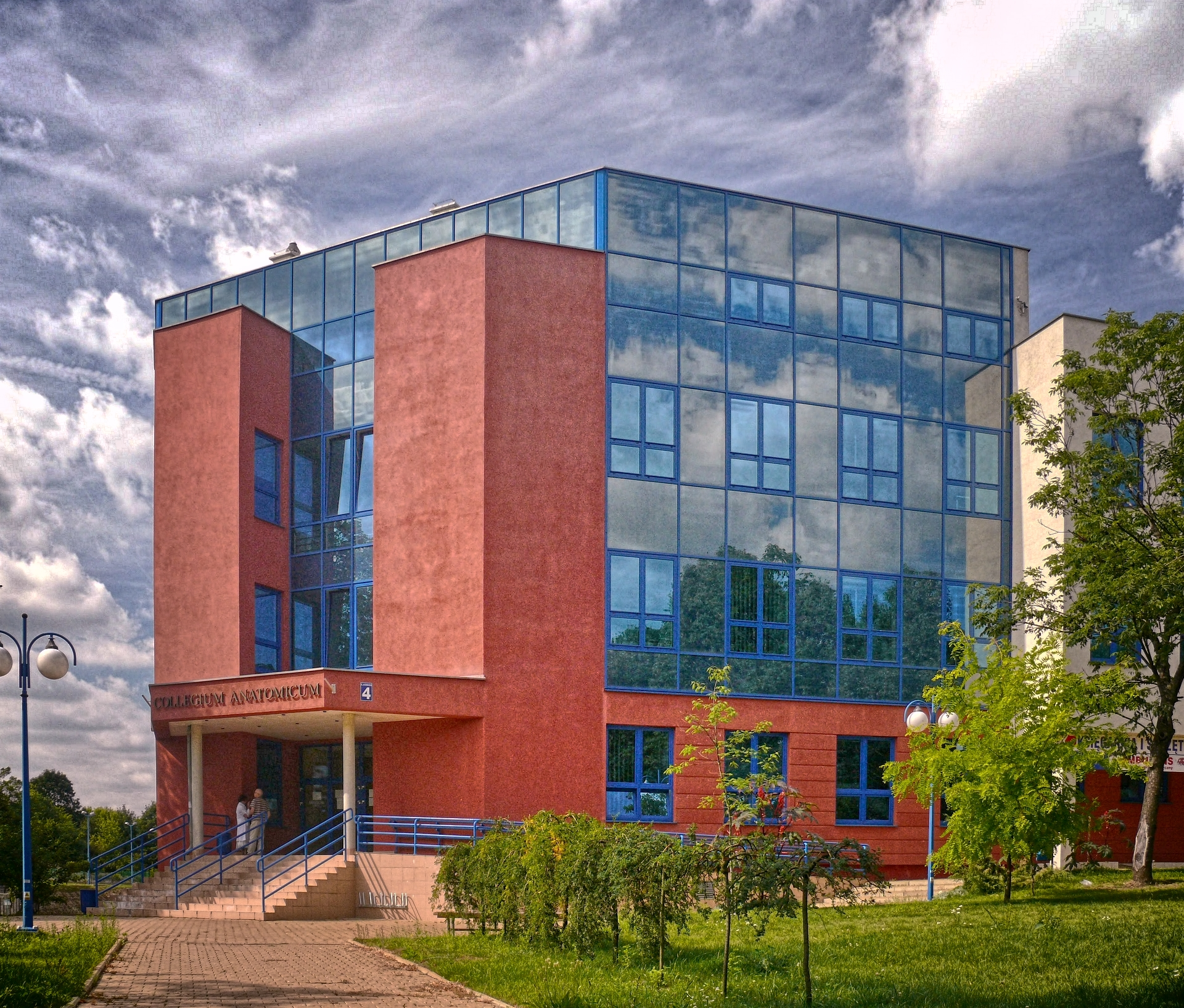
Collegium Anatomicum

== Faculties ==
- Faculty of Medicine
- Faculty of Dentistry
- Faculty of Pharmacy

== Notable people ==
Professor Tadeusz Krwawicz developed the first cryoprobe for intracapsular cataract extraction in 1961.

== English Language Division ==
In 2001, the English Language Division of the medical faculty was formed. The division offers four-year and six-year M.D. programs in which students have the option of pursuing clinical clerkships in Poland or the United States following completion of the basic sciences portion in Poland.

University rankings

Global – Overall
- USNWR Global: not listed (2018)
