= Tadeusz Krwawicz =

Polish ophthalmologist

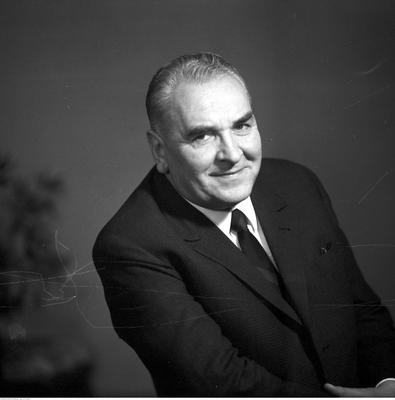
- Born: 15 January 1910; Lemberg, Austria-Hungary
- Died: 17 August 1988 (aged 78); Lublin, Poland
- Citizenship: Austria-Hungary, Poland
- Education: Jan Kazimierz University
- Known for: Cryothermic cataract extraction technique
- Scientific career
- Fields: Ophthalmology
- Workplaces: Jan Kazimierz University, Maria Curie-Skłodowska University, Medical University of Lublin

Tadeusz Krwawicz (15 January 1910 – 17 August 1988) was a Polish ophthalmologist. He pioneered the use of cryosurgery in ophthalmology.

== Career ==
He was the first to formulate a method of cataract extraction by cryoadhesion in 1961, and to develop a cryogenic probe for removal of cataracts.

The Tadeusz Krwawicz Gold Medal is awarded by the International Council of Ophthalmology Board every four years.
