= Henryk Derczyński =

Polish photographer

Henryk Derczyński (1906–1981) was a photographer who lived in Poland.

== Career ==
Derczyński was a leading photographer in 20th century Poland. He was educated in Warsaw. After World War II, he documented the fate of citizens forcibly moved to the city of Wrocław (Breslau). He later established the Cabinet of Photography in the National Museum, Wrocław. The city developed into a centre of Polish photography, and Derczyński worked at the forefront of the realist style prevalent at the time.

== Exhibitions and publications ==
Derczyński displayed numerous exhibitions and wrote many books, including the biography of Jan Bułhak—the father of Polish photography—that is considered the most sought after.

== Inventions ==
He also created an isohelia technology, a technique that sharpens contrasts and defines three-dimensional images, under the brand name "izobrom".
