= Haruhiko Okumura =

Japanese computer science education lecturer

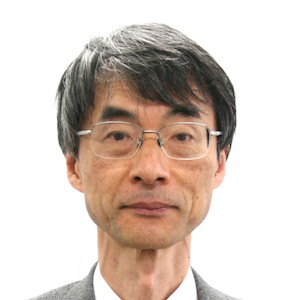
Haruhiko Okumura in 2013

Haruhiko Okumura (奥村 晴彦, Okumura Haruhiko; born 1951) is a Japanese professor.

His free LZSS implementation from 1989 is used in many products. He also worked on an adding an arithmetic-encoding step to form LZARI, the precursor to LZH.
