= Arithmetic coding =

Form of entropy encoding used in data compression

Arithmetic coding (AC) is a form of entropy coding used in lossless data compression. Normally, a string of characters is represented using a fixed number of bits per character, as in the ASCII code. When a string is converted to arithmetic encoding, frequently used characters will be stored with fewer bits and less-frequently occurring characters will be stored with more bits, resulting in fewer bits used in total. Arithmetic coding differs from other forms of entropy encoding, such as Huffman coding, in that rather than separating the input into component symbols and replacing each with a code, arithmetic coding encodes the entire message into a single number, an arbitrary-precision fraction q, where 0.0 ≤ q < 1.0.

An arithmetic coding example assuming a fixed probability distribution of three symbols "A", "B", and "C". Probability of "A" is 50%, probability of "B" is 33% and probability of "C" is 17%. Furthermore, we assume that the recursion depth is known in each step. In step one we code "B" which is inside the interval [0.5, 0.83): The binary number "0.10x" is the shortest code that represents an interval that is entirely inside [0.5, 0.83). "x" means an arbitrary bit sequence. There are two extreme cases: the smallest x stands for zero which represents the left side of the represented interval. Then the left side of the interval is dec(0.10) = 0.5. At the other extreme, x stands for a finite sequence of ones which has the upper limit dec(0.11) = 0.75. Therefore, "0.10x" represents the interval [0.5, 0.75) which is inside [0.5, 0.83). Now we can leave out the "0." part since all intervals begin with "0." and we can ignore the "x" part because no matter what bit-sequence it represents, we will stay inside [0.5, 0.75).

== Relationship to entropy ==
Arithmetic coding achieves compression by subdividing the interval [0, 1) into sub-intervals proportional to symbol probabilities. When symbol probabilities are unequal, more probable symbols receive larger sub-intervals, which require fewer bits to specify a point within. The theoretical limit on this compression is given by the entropy of the source, which Shannon's source coding theorem establishes as the minimum average number of bits per symbol that any lossless method can achieve. Arithmetic coding approaches this limit closely, especially for long messages.

When all symbols are equally likely, each sub-interval has the same size, and no symbol can be represented with fewer bits than any other. In this case the entropy reaches its maximum of $\log_2 n$ bits per symbol (where $n$ is the alphabet size), and no compression is possible. For example, a stream of independent fair coin flips has entropy of exactly 1 bit per symbol – the full cost of storage – so arithmetic coding provides no benefit. Similarly, independent ternary symbols with equal probabilities have entropy of about 1.585 bits per symbol, the maximum for a three-symbol alphabet, and are likewise incompressible.

Compression becomes possible when probabilities are unequal, because the sub-intervals become unequal in size. For instance, a binary source with probabilities 0.9 and 0.1 has entropy of approximately 0.469 bits per symbol. The symbol with probability 0.9 receives 90% of each interval, so most encoding steps barely shrink the interval, and fewer bits are needed to identify the final value. This allows arithmetic coding to achieve a compression ratio of roughly 2.1:1.

== Implementation details and examples ==
Encoding the message "WIKI" with arithmetic coding

1.	The letter frequencies are found.
2.	The interval [0, 1) is partitioned in the ratio of the frequencies.
3–5.	The corresponding interval is iteratively partitioned for each letter in the message.
6.	Any value in the final interval is chosen to represent the message.
2*–6*.	The partitioning and value if the message were "KIWI" instead.

The above example visualised as a circle, the values in red encoding "WIKI" and "KIWI" – in the SVG image, hover over an interval to highlight it and show its statistics

=== Equal probabilities ===
In the simplest case, the probability of each symbol occurring is equal. For example, consider a set of three symbols, A, B, and C, each equally likely to occur. Encoding the symbols one by one would require 2 bits per symbol, which is wasteful: one of the bit variations is never used. That is to say, symbols A, B and C might be encoded respectively as 00, 01 and 10, with 11 unused.

A more efficient solution is to represent a sequence of these three symbols as a rational number in base 3 where each digit represents a symbol. For example, the sequence "ABBCAB" could become 0.011201_{3}, in arithmetic coding as a value in the interval [0, 1). The next step is to encode this ternary number using a fixed-point binary number of sufficient precision to recover it, such as 0.0010110001_{2} – this is only 10 bits; 2 bits are saved in comparison with naïve block encoding. This is feasible for long sequences because there are efficient, in-place algorithms for converting the base of arbitrarily precise numbers.

To decode the value, knowing the original string had length 6, one can simply convert back to base 3, round to 6 digits, and recover the string.

=== Defining a model ===
In general, arithmetic coders can produce near-optimal output for any given set of symbols and probabilities. (The optimal value is −log_{2}P bits for each symbol of probability P; see Source coding theorem.) Compression algorithms that use arithmetic coding start by determining a model of the data – basically a prediction of what patterns will be found in the symbols of the message. The more accurate this prediction is, the closer to optimal the output will be.

Example: a simple, static model for describing the output of a particular monitoring instrument over time might be:

- 60% chance of symbol NEUTRAL
- 20% chance of symbol POSITIVE
- 10% chance of symbol NEGATIVE
- 10% chance of symbol END-OF-DATA. (The presence of this symbol means that the stream will be 'internally terminated', as is fairly common in data compression; when this symbol appears in the data stream, the decoder will know that the entire stream has been decoded.)

Models can also handle alphabets other than the simple four-symbol set chosen for this example. More sophisticated models are also possible: higher-order modelling changes its estimation of the current probability of a symbol based on the symbols that precede it (the context), so that in a model for English text, for example, the percentage chance of "u" would be much higher when it follows a "Q" or a "q". Models can even be adaptive, so that they continually change their prediction of the data based on what the stream actually contains. The decoder must have the same model as the encoder.

=== Encoding and decoding: overview ===
In general, each step of the encoding process, except for the last, is the same; the encoder has basically just three pieces of data to consider:

- The next symbol that needs to be encoded
- The current interval (at the very start of the encoding process, the interval is set to [0,1], but that will change)
- The probabilities the model assigns to each of the various symbols that are possible at this stage (as mentioned earlier, higher-order or adaptive models mean that these probabilities are not necessarily the same in each step.)

The encoder divides the current interval into sub-intervals, each representing a fraction of the current interval proportional to the probability of that symbol in the current context. Whichever interval corresponds to the actual symbol that is next to be encoded becomes the interval used in the next step.

Example: for the four-symbol model above:

- the interval for NEUTRAL would be [0, 0.6)
- the interval for POSITIVE would be [0.6, 0.8)
- the interval for NEGATIVE would be [0.8, 0.9)
- the interval for END-OF-DATA would be [0.9, 1).

When all symbols have been encoded, the resulting interval unambiguously identifies the sequence of symbols that produced it. Anyone who has the same final interval and model that is being used can reconstruct the symbol sequence that must have entered the encoder to result in that final interval.

It is not necessary to transmit the final interval, however; it is only necessary to transmit one fraction that lies within that interval. In particular, it is only necessary to transmit enough digits (in whatever base) of the fraction so that all fractions that begin with those digits fall into the final interval; this will guarantee that the resulting code is a prefix code.

=== Encoding and decoding: example ===
A diagram showing decoding of 0.538 (the round dot) in the example model. The region is divided into subregions proportional to symbol frequencies, then the subregion containing the point is successively subdivided in the same way.

Consider the process for decoding a message encoded with the given four-symbol model. The message is encoded in the fraction 0.538 (using decimal for clarity, instead of binary; also assuming that there are only as many digits as needed to decode the message.)

The process starts with the same interval used by the encoder: [0,1), and using the same model, dividing it into the same four sub-intervals that the encoder must have. The fraction 0.538 falls into the sub-interval for NEUTRAL, [0, 0.6); this indicates that the first symbol the encoder read must have been NEUTRAL, so this is the first symbol of the message.

Next divide the interval [0, 0.6) into sub-intervals:

- the interval for NEUTRAL would be [0, 0.36), 60% of [0, 0.6).
- the interval for POSITIVE would be [0.36, 0.48), 20% of [0, 0.6).
- the interval for NEGATIVE would be [0.48, 0.54), 10% of [0, 0.6).
- the interval for END-OF-DATA would be [0.54, 0.6), 10% of [0, 0.6).

Since 0.538 is within the interval [0.48, 0.54), the second symbol of the message must have been NEGATIVE.

Again divide our current interval into sub-intervals:

- the interval for NEUTRAL would be [0.48, 0.516).
- the interval for POSITIVE would be [0.516, 0.528).
- the interval for NEGATIVE would be [0.528, 0.534).
- the interval for END-OF-DATA would be [0.534, 0.540).

Now 0.538 falls within the interval of the END-OF-DATA symbol; therefore, this must be the next symbol. Since it is also the internal termination symbol, it means the decoding is complete. If the stream is not internally terminated, there needs to be some other way to indicate where the stream stops. Otherwise, the decoding process could continue forever, mistakenly reading more symbols from the fraction than were in fact encoded into it.

=== Sources of inefficiency ===
The message 0.538 in the previous example could have been encoded by the equally short fractions 0.534, 0.535, 0.536, 0.537 or 0.539. This suggests that the use of decimal instead of binary introduced some inefficiency. This is correct; the information content of a three-digit decimal is $3 \times \log_2(10) \approx 9.966$ bits; the same message could have been encoded in the binary fraction 0.10001001 (equivalent to 0.53515625 decimal) at a cost of only 8 bits.

This 8 bit output is larger than the information content, or entropy, of the message, which is

$$\sum -\log_2(p_i) = -\log_2(0.6) - \log_2(0.1) - \log_2(0.1) = 7.381 \text{ bits}.$$

But an integer number of bits must be used in the binary encoding, so an encoder for this message would use at least 8 bits, resulting in a message 8.4% larger than the entropy contents. This inefficiency of at most 1 bit results in relatively less overhead as the message size grows.

Moreover, the claimed symbol probabilities were [0.6, 0.2, 0.1, 0.1), but the actual frequencies in this example are [0.33, 0, 0.33, 0.33). If the intervals are readjusted for these frequencies, the entropy of the message would be 4.755 bits and the same NEUTRAL NEGATIVE END-OF-DATA message could be encoded as intervals [0, 1/3); [1/9, 2/9); [5/27, 6/27); and a binary interval of [0.00101111011, 0.00111000111). This is also an example of how statistical coding methods like arithmetic encoding can produce an output message that is larger than the input message, especially if the probability model is off.

== Adaptive arithmetic coding ==
One advantage of arithmetic coding over other similar methods of data compression is the convenience of adaptation. Adaptation is the changing of the frequency (or probability) tables while processing the data. The decoded data matches the original data as long as the frequency table in decoding is replaced in the same way and in the same step as in encoding. The synchronization is, usually, based on a combination of symbols occurring during the encoding and decoding process.

== Precision and renormalization ==
The above explanations of arithmetic coding contain some simplification. In particular, they are written as if the encoder first calculated the fractions representing the endpoints of the interval in full, using infinite precision, and only converted the fraction to its final form at the end of encoding. Rather than try to simulate infinite precision, most arithmetic coders instead operate at a fixed limit of precision which they know the decoder will be able to match, and round the calculated fractions to their nearest equivalents at that precision. An example shows how this would work if the model called for the interval [0,1) to be divided into thirds, and this was approximated with 8 bit precision. Note that since now the precision is known, so are the binary ranges we'll be able to use.

Symbol	Probability	Interval reduced to eight-bit precision		Range
Symbol	(expressed as fraction)	(as fractions)	(in binary)	(in binary)
A	1/3	[0, 85/256)	[0.00000000, 0.01010101)	00000000 – 01010100
B	1/3	[85/256, 171/256)	[0.01010101, 0.10101011)	01010101 – 10101010
C	1/3	[171/256, 1)	[0.10101011, 1.00000000)	10101011 – 11111111

A process called renormalization keeps the finite precision from becoming a limit on the total number of symbols that can be encoded. Whenever the range is reduced to the point where all values in the range share certain beginning digits, those digits are sent to the output. For however many digits of precision the computer can handle, it is now handling fewer than that, so the existing digits are shifted left, and at the right, new digits are added to expand the range as widely as possible. Note that this result occurs in two of the three cases from our previous example.

Symbol	Probability	Range	Digits that can be sent to output	Range after renormalization
A	1/3	00000000 – 01010100	0	00000000 – 10101001
B	1/3	01010101 – 10101010	None	01010101 – 10101010
C	1/3	10101011 – 11111111	1	01010110 – 11111111

== Arithmetic coding as a generalized change of radix ==
Recall that in the case where the symbols had equal probabilities, arithmetic coding could be implemented by a simple change of base, or radix. In general, arithmetic (and range) coding may be interpreted as a generalized change of radix. For example, we may look at any sequence of symbols:

$$\mathrm{DABDDB}$$

as a number in a certain base presuming that the involved symbols form an ordered set and each symbol in the ordered set denotes a sequential integer A = 0, B = 1, C = 2, D = 3, and so on. This results in the following frequencies and cumulative frequencies:

Symbol	Frequency of occurrence	Cumulative frequency
A	1	0
B	2	1
D	3	3

The cumulative frequency for an item is the sum of all frequencies preceding the item. In other words, cumulative frequency is a running total of frequencies.

In a positional numeral system the radix, or base, is numerically equal to a number of different symbols used to express the number. For example, in the decimal system the number of symbols is 10, namely 0, 1, 2, 3, 4, 5, 6, 7, 8, and 9. The radix is used to express any finite integer in a presumed multiplier in polynomial form. For example, the number 457 is actually 4×10^{2} + 5×10^{1} + 7×10^{0}, where base 10 is presumed but not shown explicitly.

Initially, we will convert DABDDB into a base-6 numeral, because 6 is the length of the string. The string is first mapped into the digit string 301331, which then maps to an integer by the polynomial:

$$6^5 \times 3 + 6^4 \times 0 + 6^3 \times 1 + 6^2 \times 3 + 6^1 \times 3 + 6^0 \times 1 = 23671$$

The result 23671 has a length of 15 bits, which is not very close to the theoretical limit (the entropy of the message), which is approximately 9 bits.

To encode a message with a length closer to the theoretical limit imposed by information theory we need to slightly generalize the classic formula for changing the radix. We will compute lower and upper bounds L and U and choose a number between them. For the computation of L we multiply each term in the above expression by the product of the frequencies of all previously occurred symbols:

$$\begin{align}
L = {} &(6^5 \times 3) + {}\\
& 3 \times (6^4 \times 0) + {}\\
& (3 \times 1) \times (6^3 \times 1) + {}\\
& (3 \times 1 \times 2) \times (6^2 \times 3) + {}\\
& (3 \times 1 \times 2 \times 3) \times (6^1 \times 3) + {}\\
& (3 \times 1 \times 2 \times 3 \times 3) \times (6^0 \times 1) {}\\
= {} & 25002
\end{align}$$

The difference between this polynomial and the polynomial above is that each term is multiplied by the product of the frequencies of all previously occurring symbols. More generally, L may be computed as:

$$L = \sum_{i=1}^n n^{n-i} C_i { \prod_{k=1}^{i-1} f_k }$$

where $\scriptstyle C_i$ are the cumulative frequencies and $\scriptstyle f_k$ are the frequencies of occurrences. Indexes denote the position of the symbol in a message. In the special case where all frequencies $\scriptstyle f_k$ are 1, this is the change-of-base formula.

The upper bound U will be L plus the product of all frequencies; in this case U = L + (3 × 1 × 2 × 3 × 3 × 2) = 25002 + 108 = 25110. In general, U is given by:

$$U = L + \prod_{k=1}^{n} f_k$$

Now we can choose any number from the interval [L, U) to represent the message; one convenient choice is the value with the longest possible trail of zeroes, 25100, since it allows us to achieve compression by representing the result as 251×10^{2}. The zeroes can also be truncated, giving 251, if the length of the message is stored separately. Longer messages will tend to have longer trails of zeroes.

To decode the integer 25100, the polynomial computation can be reversed as shown in the table below. At each stage the current symbol is identified, then the corresponding term is subtracted from the result.

Remainder	Identification	Identified symbol	Corrected remainder
25100	25100 / 6^{5} = 3	D	(25100 − 6^{5} × 3) / 3 = 590
590	590 / 6^{4} = 0	A	(590 − 6^{4} × 0) / 1 = 590
590	590 / 6^{3} = 2	B	(590 − 6^{3} × 1) / 2 = 187
187	187 / 6^{2} = 5	D	(187 − 6^{2} × 3) / 3 = 26
26	26 / 6^{1} = 4	D	(26 − 6^{1} × 3) / 3 = 2
2	2 / 6^{0} = 2	B	—

During decoding we take the floor after dividing by the corresponding power of 6. The result is then matched against the cumulative intervals and the appropriate symbol is selected from look up table. When the symbol is identified the result is corrected. The process is continued for the known length of the message or while the remaining result is positive. The only difference compared to the classical change-of-base is that there may be a range of values associated with each symbol. In this example, A is always 0, B is either 1 or 2, and D is any of 3, 4, 5. This is in exact accordance with our intervals that are determined by the frequencies. When all intervals are equal to 1 we have a special case of the classic base change.

=== Theoretical limit of compressed message ===
The lower bound L never exceeds n^{n}, where n is the size of the message, and so can be represented in $\log_2(n^n) = n \log_2(n)$ bits. After the computation of the upper bound U and the reduction of the message by selecting a number from the interval [L, U) with the longest trail of zeros we can presume that this length can be reduced by $\textstyle \log_2\left(\prod_{k=1}^n f_k\right)$ bits. Since each frequency in a product occurs exactly the same number of times as the value of this frequency, we can use the size of the alphabet A for the computation of the product

$$\prod_{k=1}^n f_k = \prod_{k=1}^A f_k^{f_k}.$$

Applying log_{2} for the estimated number of bits in the message, the final message (not counting a logarithmic overhead for the message length and frequency tables) will match the number of bits given by entropy, which for long messages is very close to optimal:

$$-\left[\sum_{i=1}^A f_i \log_2(f_i)\right] n = n H$$

In other words, the efficiency of arithmetic encoding approaches the theoretical limit of $H$ bits per symbol, as the message length approaches infinity.

==== Asymptotic equipartition ====
We can understand this intuitively. Suppose the source is ergodic, then it has the asymptotic equipartition property (AEP). By the AEP, after a long stream of $n$ symbols, the interval of $(0, 1)$ is almost partitioned into almost equally-sized intervals.

Technically, for any small $\epsilon > 0$, for all large enough $n$, there exists $2^{nH(X)(1+O(\epsilon))}$ strings $x_{1:n}$, such that each string has almost equal probability $Pr(x_{1:n}) = 2^{-nH(X)(1+ O(\epsilon))}$, and their total probability is $1-O(\epsilon)$.

For any such string, it is arithmetically encoded by a binary string of length $k$, where $k$ is the smallest $k$ such that there exists a fraction of form $\frac{?}{2^k}$ in the interval for $x_{1:n}$. Since the interval for $x_{1:n}$ has size $2^{-nH(X)(1+ O(\epsilon))}$, we should expect it to contain one fraction of form $\frac{?}{2^k}$ when $k = nH(X)(1+O(\epsilon))$.

Thus, with high probability, $x_{1:n}$ can be arithmetically encoded with a binary string of length $nH(X) ( 1 + O(\epsilon))$.

== Connections with other compression methods ==
=== Huffman coding ===
Because arithmetic coding doesn't compress one datum at a time, it can get arbitrarily close to entropy when compressing IID strings. By contrast, using the extension of Huffman coding (to strings) does not reach entropy unless all probabilities of alphabet symbols are powers of two, in which case both Huffman and arithmetic coding achieve entropy.

When naively Huffman coding binary strings, no compression is possible, even if entropy is low (e.g. ({0, 1}) has probabilities {0.95, 0.05}). Huffman encoding assigns 1 bit to each value, resulting in a code of the same length as the input. By contrast, arithmetic coding compresses bits well, approaching the optimal compression ratio of

$$1 - [-0.95 \log_2(0.95) + -0.05 \log_2(0.05)] \approx 71.4\%.$$

One simple way to address Huffman coding's suboptimality is to concatenate symbols ("blocking") to form a new alphabet in which each new symbol represents a sequence of original symbols – in this case bits – from the original alphabet. In the above example, grouping sequences of three symbols before encoding would produce new "super-symbols" with the following frequencies:

- 000: 85.7%
- 001, 010, 100: 4.5% each
- 011, 101, 110: 0.24% each
- 111: 0.0125%

With this grouping, Huffman coding averages 1.3 bits for every three symbols, or 0.433 bits per symbol, compared with one bit per symbol in the original encoding, i.e., $56.7\%$ compression. Allowing arbitrarily large sequences gets arbitrarily close to entropy – just like arithmetic coding – but requires huge codes to do so, so is not as practical as arithmetic coding for this purpose.

An alternative is encoding run lengths via Huffman-based Golomb-Rice codes. Such an approach allows simpler and faster encoding/decoding than arithmetic coding or even Huffman coding, since the latter requires a table lookups. In the {0.95, 0.05} example, a Golomb-Rice code with a four-bit remainder achieves a compression ratio of $71.1\%$, far closer to optimum than using three-bit blocks. Golomb-Rice codes only apply to Bernoulli inputs such as the one in this example, however, so it is not a substitute for blocking in all cases.

== History and patents ==
Basic algorithms for arithmetic coding were developed independently by Jorma J. Rissanen, at IBM Research, and by Richard C. Pasco, a Ph.D. student at Stanford University; both were published in May 1976. Pasco cites a pre-publication draft of Rissanen's article and comments on the relationship between their works:

One algorithm of the family was developed independently by Rissanen [1976]. It shifts the code element to the most significant end of the accumulator, using a pointer obtained by addition and exponentiation. We shall now compare the alternatives in the three choices, and see that it is preferable to shift the code element rather than the accumulator, and to add code elements to the least significant end of the accumulator.

Less than a year after publication, IBM filed for a US patent on Rissanen's work. Pasco's work was not patented.

A variety of specific techniques for arithmetic coding have historically been covered by US patents, although various well-known methods have since passed into the public domain as the patents have expired. Techniques covered by patents may be essential for implementing the algorithms for arithmetic coding that are specified in some formal international standards. When this is the case, such patents are generally available for licensing under what is called "reasonable and non-discriminatory" (RAND) licensing terms (at least as a matter of standards-committee policy). In some well-known instances, (including some involving IBM patents that have since expired), such licenses were available for free, and in other instances, licensing fees have been required. The availability of licenses under RAND terms does not necessarily satisfy everyone who might want to use the technology, as what may seem "reasonable" for a company preparing a proprietary commercial software product may seem much less reasonable for a free software or open source project.

At least one significant compression software program, bzip2, deliberately discontinued the use of arithmetic coding in favor of Huffman coding due to the perceived patent situation at the time. Also, encoders and decoders of the JPEG file format, which has options for both Huffman encoding and arithmetic coding, typically only support the Huffman encoding option, which was originally because of patent concerns; the result is that nearly all JPEG images in use today use Huffman encoding although JPEG's arithmetic coding patents have expired due to the age of the JPEG standard (the design of which was approximately completed by 1990). JPEG XL, as well as archivers like PackJPG, Brunsli and Lepton, that can losslessly convert Huffman encoded files to ones with arithmetic coding (or asymmetric numeral systems in case of JPEG XL), show up to 25% size saving.

The JPEG image compression format's arithmetic coding algorithm is based on the following cited patents (since expired).

- U.S. patent 4,652,856 – (IBM) Filed 4 February 1986, granted 24 March 1987 – Kottappuram M. A. Mohiuddin, Jorma Johannes Rissanen – Multiplication-free multi-alphabet arithmetic code
- U.S. patent 4,905,297 – (IBM) Filed 18 November 1988, granted 27 February 1990 – Glen George Langdon, Joan L. Mitchell, William B. Pennebaker, Jorma Johannes Rissanen – Arithmetic coding encoder and decoder system
- U.S. patent 4,935,882 – (IBM) Filed 20 July 1988, granted 19 June 1990 – William B. Pennebaker, Joan L. Mitchell – Probability adaptation for arithmetic coders
- JP Patent 1021672 – (Mitsubishi) Filed 21 January 1989, granted 10 August 1990 – Toshihiro Kimura, Shigenori Kino, Fumitaka Ono, Masayuki Yoshida – Coding system
- JP Patent 2-46275 – (Mitsubishi) Filed 26 February 1990, granted 5 November 1991 – Fumitaka Ono, Tomohiro Kimura, Masayuki Yoshida, Shigenori Kino – Coding apparatus and coding method

Other patents (mostly also expired) related to arithmetic coding include the following.

- U.S. patent 4,122,440 – (IBM) Filed 4 March 1977, granted 24 October 1978 – Glen George Langdon, Jorma Johannes Rissanen – Method and means for arithmetic string coding
- U.S. patent 4,286,256 – (IBM) Filed 28 November 1979, granted 25 August 1981 – Glen George Langdon, Jorma Johannes Rissanen – Method and means for arithmetic coding utilizing a reduced number of operations
- U.S. patent 4,467,317 – (IBM) Filed 30 March 1981, granted 21 August 1984 – Glen George Langdon, Jorma Johannes Rissanen – High-speed arithmetic compression coding using concurrent value updating
- U.S. patent 4,891,643 – (IBM) Filed 15 September 1986, granted 2 January 1990 – Joan L. Mitchell, William B. Pennebaker – Arithmetic coding data compression/de-compression by selectively employed, diverse arithmetic coding encoders and decoders
- JP Patent 11782787 – (NEC) Filed 13 May 1987, granted 18 November 1988 – Michio Shimada – Data compressing arithmetic encoding device
- JP Patent 15015487 – (KDDI) Filed 18 June 1987, granted 22 December 1988 – Shuichi Matsumoto, Masahiro Saito – System for preventing carrying propagation in arithmetic coding
- U.S. patent 4,933,883 – (IBM) Filed 3 May 1988, granted 12 June 1990 – William B. Pennebaker, Joan L. Mitchell – Probability adaptation for arithmetic coders
- U.S. patent 4,989,000 – (IBM) Filed 19 June 1989, granted 29 January 1991 – Dan S. Chevion, Ehud D. Karnin, Eugeniusz Walach – Data string compression using arithmetic encoding with simplified probability subinterval estimation
- U.S. patent 5,099,440 – (IBM) Filed 5 January 1990, granted 24 March 1992 – William B. Pennebaker, Joan L. Mitchell – Probability adaptation for arithmetic coders
- U.S. patent 5,272,478 – (Ricoh) Filed 17 August 1992, granted 21 December 1993 – James D. Allen – Method and apparatus for entropy coding

Note: This list is not exhaustive. See the following links for a list of more US patents. The Dirac codec uses arithmetic coding and is not patent pending.

Patents on arithmetic coding may exist in other jurisdictions; see software patents for a discussion of the patentability of software around the world.

== Benchmarks and other technical characteristics ==
Every programmatic implementation of arithmetic encoding has a different compression ratio and performance. While compression ratios vary only a little (usually under 1%), the code execution time can vary by a factor of 10. Choosing the right encoder from a list of publicly available encoders is not a simple task because performance and compression ratio depend also on the type of data, particularly on the size of the alphabet (number of different symbols). One of two particular encoders may have better performance for small alphabets while the other may show better performance for large alphabets. Most encoders have limitations on the size of the alphabet and many of them are specialized for alphabets of exactly two symbols (0 and 1).
