= XAD =

XAD may refer to:

- XAD (resins), absorbent resins used in the Adsorption Method for Sampling of Dioxins and Furans
- XAD (software) - an open-source, client-based, unarchiving system for the Amiga
