= List of algebraic coding theory topics =

This is a list of algebraic coding theory topics.

- ARQ
- Adler-32
- Algebraic geometry code
- BCH code
- BCJR algorithm
- Belief propagation
- Berger code
- Berlekamp–Massey algorithm
- Binary Golay code
- Binary Goppa code
- Bipolar violation
- CRHF
- Casting out nines
- Check digit
- Chien's search
- Chipkill
- Cksum
- Coding gain
- Coding theory
- Constant-weight code
- Convolutional code
- Cross R-S code
- Cryptographic hash function
- Cyclic redundancy check
- Damm algorithm
- Dual code
- EXIT chart
- Error-correcting code
- Enumerator polynomial
- Fletcher's checksum
- Forward error correction
- Forward–backward algorithm
- Gilbert–Varshamov bound
- GOST (hash function)
- Group coded recording
- HAS-160
- HAS-V
- HAVAL
- Hadamard code
- Hagelbarger code
- Hamming bound
- Hamming code
- Hamming(7,4)
- Hamming distance
- Hamming weight
- Hash collision
- Hash function
- Hash list
- Hash tree
- Induction puzzles
- Integrity check value
- Interleaving
- ISBN
- ISMN
- LM hash
- Lexicographic code
- Linear code
- Link adaptation
- Low-density parity-check
- Luhn algorithm
- Luhn mod N algorithm
- M of n codes
- MD2
- MD4
- MD5
- MDC-2
- Majority logic decoding
- McWilliams identity
- Md5sum
- Merkle–Damgård construction
- N-Hash
- Negative-acknowledge character
- One-way compression function
- Parity bit
- Pearson hashing
- Perfect code
- Quantum fingerprinting
- RIPEMD
- Random oracle
- Redundancy check
- Reed–Solomon code
- Reed–Solomon error correction
- Repeat-accumulate code
- Repetition code
- SEC-DED
- SFV
- SHA-1
- SHA-2
- Sanity testing
- Shaping codes
- Singleton bound
- Snake-in-the-box
- Snefru
- Soft output Viterbi algorithm
- Sparse graph code
- Syndrome decoding
- Tanner graph
- Ternary Golay code
- Tiger (hash function)
- Transverse redundancy check
- Triple modular redundancy
- Turbo code
- UOWHF
- Universal hashing
- Universal Product Code
- Verhoeff algorithm
- Viterbi algorithm
- Viterbi decoder
- WHIRLPOOL
