= Zhengdao Wang =

Chinese-American electrical engineer

Zhengdao Wang is a Chinese-American electrical engineer known for his contributions to multicarrier communications and coding theory, as well as the performance analysis of Wireless systems. He is a professor of electrical and computer engineering at Iowa State University, and a program director in the Division of Electrical, Communications and Cyber Systems of the National Science Foundation.

== Education ==
In 1996, Wang earned a Bachelor of Engineering in Electronic Engineering and Information Science from the University of Science and Technology of China. He pursued graduate studies in the United States, earning a master's degree in electical engineering from the University of Virginia in 1999 and completing a Ph.D. at the University of Minnesota in 2002.

== Recognition ==
Wang was named a Fellow of the IEEE in 2016, "for contributions to multicarrier communications and performance analysis of wireless systems".
