= Gailly =

Gailly is a French surname. Notable people with the surname include:

- Christian Gailly (1943–2013), French writer
- Étienne Gailly (1922–1971), Belgian soldier and Olympic runner
- Jean-Loup Gailly (born 1956), French computer programmer
- Paul Gailly (1894–1969), Belgian water polo player
