= OpenCritic =

Video game review aggregator

- Website type: Review aggregator
- Owner: Valnet
- Creators: Matthew Enthoven, Charles Green, Richard Triggs, Aaron Rutledge
- Website: opencritic.com
- Commercial: Yes
- Launched: September 30, 2015; 11 years ago
- Current status: Active

OpenCritic is a review aggregation website for video games. OpenCritic lists reviews from critics across multiple video game publications for the games listed on the site, generating a numeric score by averaging all of the reviews. Several other metrics are also available, such as the percentage of critics that recommend the game and its relative ranking across all games on OpenCritic.

== History ==
OpenCritic was developed to avoid some of the controversies that Metacritic has gained in the video game industry. A game's Metacritic score has become strongly attached to the financial performance of a game and subsequent efforts of the development studio and publisher, such as affecting post-release studio bonuses. However, Metacritic provides limited details of how it calculates its review scores, and uses weighted averaging that favors some publications over others, leading many to criticize the heavy weight that the industry puts on the site.

The concept of OpenCritic was developed by a team led by Matthew Enthoven of Riot Games. The site was designed to make the nature of review aggregation clear, opting for a simple arithmetic mean, in contrast to the hidden weights used by Metacritic. The site also highlights review authors' names and allows users to customize what reviews took priority.

The site began development in 2014, and formally launched on September 30, 2015, with reviews from 75 publications. The site generally only supports video game reviews from its launch date forward and there are no plans to fully populate older games. Developers can submit games for inclusion on the site as long as certain qualifications are met; further, other review sources can also request addition to the site by meeting certain qualifications. In addition to pages for game reviews, OpenCritic has pages for individual publications and reviewers. The site initially launched ad free, using Patreon to start, but since incorporated an ad-revenue supported model in addition to Patreon.

In October 2017, OpenCritic announced that monetization information would be added to game pages, citing the prevalence of loot boxes in modern releases. They also mentioned they would be testing out different types of flags to apply to game review pages, including clarifying whether a game has a loot box system that randomizes the progress in a game rather than it being experience-driven and whether a game's randomly generated loot boxes contain more than "cosmetic" rewards. The feature launched in February 2019.

The Epic Games Store incorporated OpenCritic's aggregation and summary onto game product store pages in January 2020. The GOG store front added OpenCritic statistics alongside critic reviews in December 2022.

On July 31, 2024, it was announced that media company Valnet had acquired OpenCritic. In January 2025, Rutledge Daugette, who previously worked for OpenCritic, announced new aggregator CriticDB.

== Content ==
OpenCritic collects links to external websites for video game reviews, providing a landing page for the reader. Reviews include both those that are scored (and thus entered into their aggregate score) and unscored reviews, including reviews that come from popular YouTube reviewers. Reviews are summarized in three ways: a 'Top Critic Average' calculated by taking the simple average score of all numeric reviews written by top critics after normalizing the score on a 0–100 scale, a percent recommended which represents the percent of all reviews that recommend the game (including unscored positive reviews) or gave a positive review, and a percentile rank which indicates where a game's aggregate score falls in the distribution of all games on the site.

OpenCritic used to allow users to mark any of these review sources as trusted publications which will be reflected in how the reviews are presented to the user and tailor the content to them, as well as generating a personalized aggregate score for that user. However, this feature is no longer available.
