= BSD checksum =

Legacy checksum algorithm

The BSD checksum algorithm was a commonly used, legacy checksum algorithm. It has been implemented in old BSD and is also available through the sum command line utility.

This algorithm is useless from a security perspective, and is weaker than the CRC-32 cksum for error detection.

== Computation of the BSD checksum ==
Below is the relevant part of the GNU sum source code (GPL licensed). It computes a 16-bit checksum by adding up all bytes (8-bit words) of the input data stream. In order to avoid many of the weaknesses of simply adding the data, the checksum accumulator is circular rotated to the right by one bit at each step before the new char is added.

int bsdChecksumFromFile(FILE *fp) /* The file handle for input data */
{
    int checksum = 0;             /* The checksum mod 2^16. */

    for (int ch = getc(fp); ch != EOF; ch = getc(fp)) {
        checksum = (checksum >> 1) + ((checksum & 1) << 15);
        checksum += ch;
        checksum &= 0xffff;       /* Keep it within bounds. */
    }
    return checksum;
}

== Description of the algorithm ==
As mentioned above, this algorithm computes a checksum by segmenting the data and adding it to an accumulator that is circular right shifted between each summation. To keep the accumulator within return value bounds, bit-masking with 1's is done.

Example: Calculating a 4-bit checksum using 4-bit sized segments (big-endian)

Input: 101110001110 -> three segments: 1011, 1000, 1110.

Iteration 1:

 segment: 1011        checksum: 0000        bitmask: 1111

a) Apply circular shift to the checksum:

 0000 -> 0000

b) Add checksum and segment together, apply bitmask onto the obtained result:

 0000 + 1011 = 1011 -> 1011 & 1111 = 1011

Iteration 2:

 segment: 1000        checksum: 1011        bitmask: 1111

a) Apply circular shift to the checksum:

 1011 -> 1101

b) Add checksum and segment together, apply bitmask onto the obtained result:

 1101 + 1000 = 10101 -> 10101 & 1111 = 0101

Iteration 3:

 segment: 1110        checksum: 0101        bitmask: 1111

a) Apply circular shift to the checksum:

 0101 -> 1010

b) Add checksum and segment together, apply bitmask onto the obtained result:

 1010 + 1110 = 11000 -> 11000 & 1111 = 1000

Final checksum: 1000

== Sources ==
- official FreeBSD sum source code
- official GNU sum manual page
- GNU sum source code
