= Simple file verification =

File format for storing file checksums

- Filename extension: .sfv
- Internet media type: text/x-sfv
- Type of format: Plain text list of CRC-32 checksums

Simple file verification (SFV) is a file format for storing CRC-32 checksums of files to verify the integrity of files. SFV is used to verify that a file has not been corrupted, but it does not otherwise verify the file's authenticity. The .sfv file extension is usually used for SFV files.

== Checksum ==
Files can become corrupted for a variety of reasons, including faulty storage media, errors in transmission, write errors during copying or moving, and software bugs. SFV verification ensures that a file has not been corrupted by comparing the file's CRC hash value to a previously calculated value. Due to the nature of hash functions, hash collisions may result in false positives, but the likelihood of collisions is usually negligible with random corruption. (The number of possible checksums is limited though large, so that with any checksum scheme many files will have the same checksum. However, the probability of a corrupted file having the same checksum as its original is exceedingly small, unless deliberately constructed to maintain the checksum.)

SFV cannot be used to verify the authenticity of files, as CRC-32 is not a collision resistant hash function; even if the hash sum file is not tampered with, it is computationally trivial for an attacker to cause deliberate hash collisions, meaning that a malicious change in the file is not detected by a hash comparison. In cryptography, this attack is called a collision attack. For this reason, the md5sum and sha1sum utilities are often preferred in Unix operating systems, which use the MD5 and SHA-1 cryptographic hash functions respectively.

Even a single-bit error causes both SFV's CRC and md5sum's cryptographic hash to fail, requiring the entire file to be re-fetched. The Parchive and rsync utilities are often preferred for verifying that a file has not been accidentally corrupted in transmission, since they can correct common small errors with a much shorter download.

Despite the weaknesses of the SFV format, it is popular due to the relatively small amount of time taken by SFV utilities to calculate the CRC-32 checksums when compared to the time taken to calculate cryptographic hashes such as MD5 or SHA-1.

SFV uses a plain text file containing one line for each file and its checksum in the format FILENAME<whitespaces>CHECKSUM. Any line starting with a semicolon ';' is considered to be a comment and is ignored for the purposes of file verification. The delimiter between the filename and checksum is always one or several spaces; tabs are never used. A sample SFV file is:

; This is a comment
file_one.zip   c45ad668
file_two.zip   7903b8e6
file_three.zip e99a65fb

=== Command-line utility ===
An example of an open-source cross-platform command-line utility that outputs crc32 checksums is 7-Zip.

Many Linux distributions include a simple command-line tool cksfv to verify the checksums.

== See also ==
- Cyclic redundancy check (CRC)
- File verification
- Parchive
