= JSCC =

JSCC may refer to:

- Jacobite Syrian Christian Church, an Indian autonomous Oriental Orthodox church
- Japan Securities Clearing Corporation, a financial services company and subsidiary of the Japan Exchange Group
- Joint source and channel coding, a setting in Information theory where source coding and channel coding are carried out simultaneously
- Joint Support Coordination Cell, planned security and defence (CSDP) body of the European Union's (EU) European External Action Service
