= Tycho-2 Catalogue =

Astronomical catalogue of the brightest stars

The Tycho-2 catalogue of the 2.5 million brightest stars
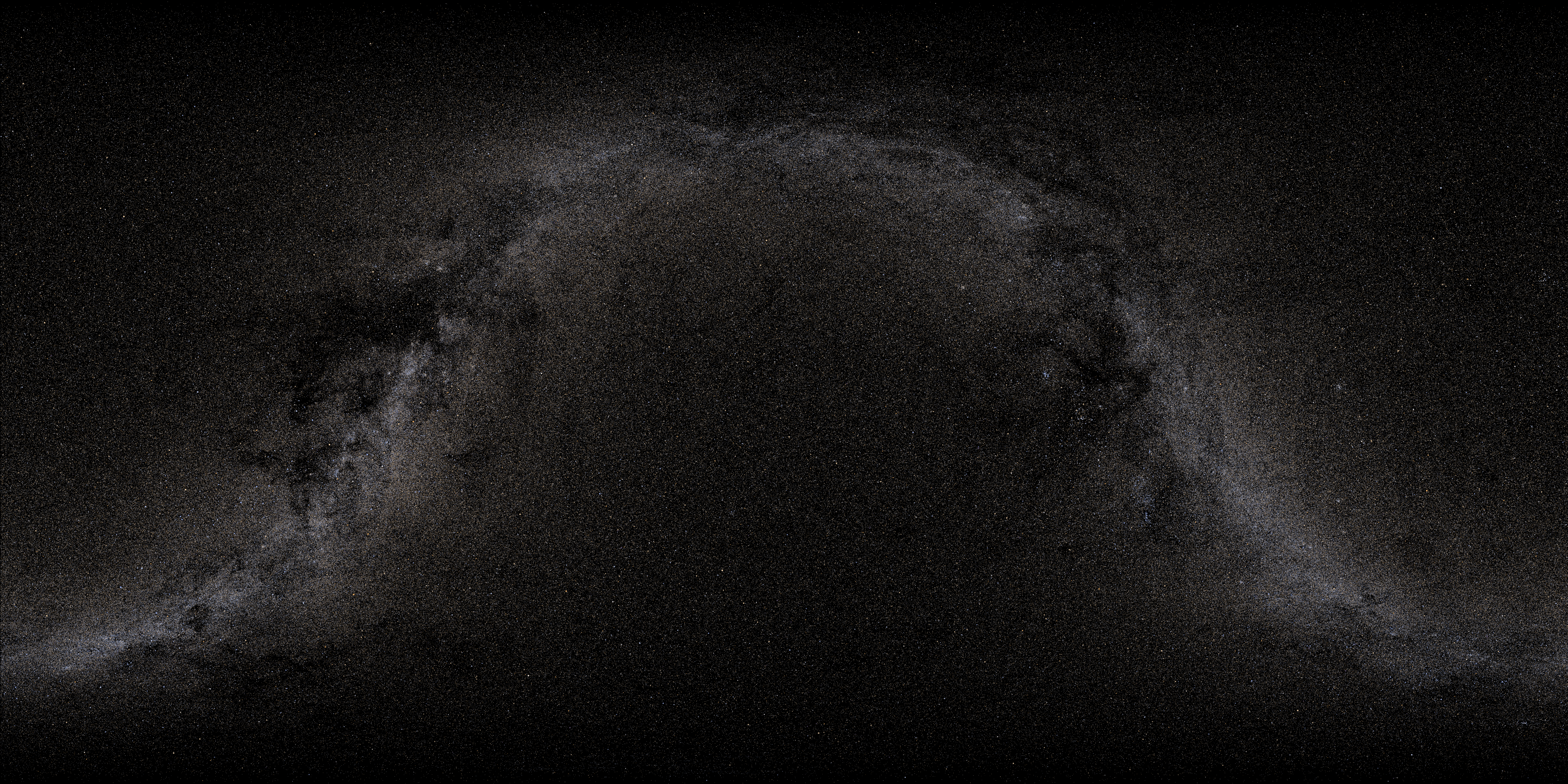
- Alternative names: TYC
- Published: March 2000
- Related media on Commons

The Tycho-2 Catalogue is an astronomical catalogue of more than 2.5 million of the brightest stars.

== Catalogue ==
The astrometric reference catalogue contain positions, proper motions, and two-color photometric data for 2,539,913 of the brightest stars in the Milky Way. Components of double stars with separations down to 0.8 arcseconds are included. The catalogue is 99% complete to magnitudes of V~11.0 and 90% complete to V~11.5.

The Tycho-2 positions and magnitudes are based on the observations collected by the star mapper of the European Space Agency's Hipparcos satellite. They are the same observations used to compile the Tycho-1 Catalogue (ESA SP-1200, 1997). However, Tycho-2 is much larger and a bit more precise, because a more advanced reduction technique was used.

The U.S. Naval Observatory (USNO) first compiled the ACT Reference Catalog, (Astrographic Catalogue / Tycho) containing nearly one million stars, by combining the Astrographic Catalogue (AC 2000) with the Tycho-1 Catalogue; the large epoch span between the two catalogues improved the accuracy of proper motions by about an order of magnitude. Tycho-2 now supersedes the ACT.

Proper motions precise to about 2.5 milliarcseconds per year are given as derived from a comparison with the Astrographic Catalogue (AC 2000) and 143 other ground-based astrometric catalogues, all reduced to the Hipparcos celestial coordinate system. There were only about 100,000 stars for which proper motion could not be derived. For stars brighter than Vt=9, the astrometric error is 7 milliarcseconds. The overall error for all stars is 60 milliarcseconds. The observational period was from 1989.85 to 1993.21 and the mean satellite observation epoch is 1991.5.

Photometric accuracy for stars brighter than Vt=9 is 0.013 magnitude; for all stars it is 0.10 magnitude.

== Accessing the catalogue ==
To enable rapid access of specific stars in the catalogue, WCSTools software numbers each star using its Guide Star region number (0001 to 9537) and a five-digit star number within each region, separated by a decimal point. sty2 lists Tycho-2 stars by number or sky region. imty2 lists the Tycho-2 stars within an IRAF or FITS image using the world coordinate system defined in its header.

A Perl program for extracting data from the catalogue is available from http://archive.eso.org/ASTROM/. Tycho-2 File Formats WCSTools software uses the files catalog.dat and index.dat.

== External resources ==
The following FTP sites make the Tycho-2 catalogue available as 20 gzipped files. After retrieving them and the index.dat file, combine the gzipped files into catalog.dat. The resulting files will differ from the files on the CD-ROM in that they will end lines with only a linefeed, while the CD-ROM version for which WCSTools software was written terminates lines with a carriage return and a linefeed. Add the carriage returns to the files using the unix2dos -ascii command.

Put the catalog.dat and index.dat files in a subdirectory data/ to the directory pointed to by the TY2_PATH environment parameter or the ty2cd variable in libwcs/ty2read.c.

- Centre de données astronomiques de Strasbourg

== Double stars ==
A re-analysis of the original Tycho data in 2002 was used to create a catalogue of multiple stars, the 'Tycho Double Star Catalogue.

== See also ==
- Hipparcos and Tycho catalogues
- Gaia (spacecraft)
- Category:Hipparcos objects
- Star catalogue
