= Libpng =

Free software library

libpng
- Developers: Guy Eric Schalnat, Andreas Dilger, Glenn Randers-Pehrson, et al.
- Stable release: 1.6.58 / 15 April 2026; 25 days ago
- Written in: C
- Operating system: Cross-platform
- Type: Image library
- License: libpng License
- Website: libpng.org/pub/png/libpng.html
- Repository: sf.net/p/libpng/code/

libpng is the official Portable Network Graphics (PNG) reference library (originally called pnglib). It is a platform-independent library that contains C functions for handling PNG images. It supports almost all of PNG's features, is extensible, and has been widely used and tested for over 28 years. libpng is dependent on zlib for data compression and decompression routines.

libpng is released under the libpng license, a permissive free software licence, and is free software. It is frequently used in both free and proprietary software, either directly or through the use of a higher level image library.

As of 2017 the latest versions in the 1.6.x and 1.5.x branches were considered as release versions, while 1.4.x, 1.2.x, and 1.0.x were considered as legacy versions getting only security fixes. All vulnerability warnings and crash bugs are published on the main page.
