= SFV =

SFV could refer to:

- Simple file verification, computer file checksum format
- Simian foamy virus
- San Fernando Valley
- Suitable For Vegans
- Street Fighter V, the fifth installment in the Street Fighter video game series
- Swiss Football Association, governing body of football in Switzerland
- National Property Board of Sweden, or Statens fastighetsverk, abbreviated SFV
- Saybolt FUROL viscosity
