= Zlib License =

Permissive free software license

zlib license
- Author: Jean-loup Gailly and Mark Adler
- Latest version: 1.2.11
- Publisher: Jean-loup Gailly and Mark Adler
- Published: 15 April 1995
- SPDX identifier: Zlib
- Debian FSG compatible: Yes
- FSF approved: Yes
- OSI approved: Yes
- GPL compatible: Yes
- Copyleft: No
- Linking from code with a different license: Yes

The zlib license is a permissive software license which defines the terms under which the zlib software library can be distributed. It is also used by many other open-source packages. The libpng library uses a similar license, libpng license, sometimes referred interchangeably as zlib/libpng license.

The zlib license has been approved by the Free Software Foundation (FSF) as a free software license, and by the Open Source Initiative (OSI) as an open source license. It is compatible with the GNU General Public License.

== Terms ==
The license only has the following points to be accounted for:

- Software is used on 'as-is' basis. Authors are not liable for any damages arising from its use.
- The distribution of a modified version of the software is subject to the following restrictions:
  1. The authorship of the original software must not be misrepresented,
  2. Altered source versions must not be misrepresented as being the original software, and
  3. The license notice must not be removed from source distributions.

The license does not require source code to be made available if distributing binary code.

== Text ==
The license terms are as follows:

Copyright (c) <year> <copyright holders>

This software is provided 'as-is', without any express or implied warranty. In no event will the authors be held liable for any damages arising from the use of this software.

Permission is granted to anyone to use this software for any purpose, including commercial applications, and to alter it and redistribute it freely, subject to the following restrictions:

1. The origin of this software must not be misrepresented; you must not claim that you wrote the original software. If you use this software in a product, an acknowledgment in the product documentation would be appreciated but is not required.
2. Altered source versions must be plainly marked as such, and must not be misrepresented as being the original software.
3. This notice may not be removed or altered from any source distribution.

== See also ==
- Comparison of free and open-source software licenses
- Software using the zlib license (category)
