= HAS-V =

Cryptographic hash function

HAS-V is a cryptographic hash function with a variable output length. HAS-V is a hash function based on a block cipher. The hash function can produce hash values with lengths from 16 to 40 bytes.

== Specifications ==
- Digest Size: 128-320 bits
- Max message length: <2^{64} bits
- Compression Function: 1024-bit message block, 320-bit chaining variable

The hash function was developed by Nan Kyoung Park, Joon Ho Hwang and Pil Joong Lee, and was released in 2000.

== See also ==
- One-way compression function - Describes how hash functions can be built from block ciphers.
