= Kingo Root =

App to root an Android device

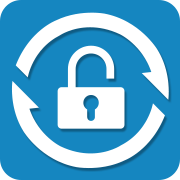
- Website type: Tools
- Available in: English, Russian, German, French, Spanish, Turkish, Italian, Serbian
- Website: www.kingoapp.com
- Current status: Discontinued

KingoRoot was software intended to provide root access on smartphones, tablet computers, etc. running all versions of the Android operating system from 4.1.2, available since 2013 then discontinued sometime in mid-to-late June 2026 with downloads removed and servers no longer accessible. There is another very similar Android Application with the same purpose, KingRoot launched at about the same time; the two very similarly-named applications are often confused.

KingoRoot was used in an exploit by ZNIU along with the DirtyCow exploit in September 2017 to gain root access.

KingoRoot was banned from the XDA Developers forum along with vRoot in November 2013 due to concerns with the information collected by the app during the rooting process.

== Reviews ==
CNET gave Kingo Android Root 3.5 out of 5 stars, and Rick Broida, a CNET editor, says the KingoRoot app "makes rooting a one-click affair", while noting that it does not work for all devices.

Digital Trends said that using an app is "one of the easiest ways to root your Android device", and included KingoRoot in its list of most reliable rooting apps.

A long thread on the respected xda-developers Web site concluded, with detailed information and links, that the similarly named app KingRoot should be considered adware and malware, although it is often successful in gaining root access.

== See also ==
- Android rooting
- Android version history
- Comparison of mobile operating systems
