= Coding gain =

Coding theory concept

In coding theory, telecommunications engineering and other related engineering problems, coding gain is the measure in the difference between the signal-to-noise ratio (SNR) levels between the uncoded system and coded system required to reach the same bit error rate (BER) levels when used with the error correcting code (ECC).

== Example ==
If the uncoded BPSK system in AWGN environment has a bit error rate (BER) of 10^{−2} at the SNR level 4 dB, and the corresponding coded (e.g., BCH) system has the same BER at an SNR of 2.5 dB, then we say the coding gain = 4 dB − 2.5 dB = 1.5 dB, due to the code used (in this case BCH).

== Power-limited regime ==
In the power-limited regime (where the nominal spectral efficiency $\rho \le 2$ [b/2D or b/s/Hz], i.e. the domain of binary signaling), the effective coding gain $\gamma_\mathrm{eff}(A)$ of a signal set $A$ at a given target error probability per bit $P_b(E)$ is defined as the difference in dB between the $E_b/N_0$ required to achieve the target $P_b(E)$ with $A$ and the $E_b/N_0$ required to achieve the target $P_b(E)$ with 2-PAM or (2×2)-QAM (i.e. no coding). The nominal coding gain $\gamma_c(A)$ is defined as

$$\gamma_c(A) = \frac{d^2_{\min}(A)}{4E_b}.$$

This definition is normalized so that $\gamma_c(A) = 1$ for 2-PAM or (2×2)-QAM. If the average number of nearest neighbors per transmitted bit $K_b(A)$ is equal to one, the effective coding gain $\gamma_\mathrm{eff}(A)$ is approximately equal to the nominal coding gain $\gamma_c(A)$. However, if $K_b(A)>1$, the effective coding gain $\gamma_\mathrm{eff}(A)$ is less than the nominal coding gain $\gamma_c(A)$ by an amount which depends on the steepness of the $P_b(E)$ vs. $E_b/N_0$ curve at the target $P_b(E)$. This curve can be plotted using the union bound estimate (UBE)

$$P_b(E) \approx K_b(A)Q\left(\sqrt{\frac{2\gamma_c(A)E_b}{N_0}}\right),$$

where Q is the Gaussian probability-of-error function.

For the special case of a binary linear block code $C$ with parameters $(n,k,d)$, the nominal spectral efficiency is $\rho = 2k/n$ and the nominal coding gain is kd/n.

== Example ==
The table below lists the nominal spectral efficiency, nominal coding gain and effective coding gain at $P_b(E) \approx 10^{-5}$ for Reed–Muller codes of length $n \le 64$:

Code	$\rho$	$\gamma_c$	$\gamma_c$ (dB)	$K_b$	$\gamma_\mathrm{eff}$ (dB)
[8,7,2]	1.75	7/4	2.43	4	2.0
[8,4,4]	1.0	2	3.01	4	2.6
[16,15,2]	1.88	15/8	2.73	8	2.1
[16,11,4]	1.38	11/4	4.39	13	3.7
[16,5,8]	0.63	5/2	3.98	6	3.5
[32,31,2]	1.94	31/16	2.87	16	2.1
[32,26,4]	1.63	13/4	5.12	48	4.0
[32,16,8]	1.00	4	6.02	39	4.9
[32,6,16]	0.37	3	4.77	10	4.2
[64,63,2]	1.97	63/32	2.94	32	1.9
[64,57,4]	1.78	57/16	5.52	183	4.0
[64,42,8]	1.31	21/4	7.20	266	5.6
[64,22,16]	0.69	11/2	7.40	118	6.0
[64,7,32]	0.22	7/2	5.44	18	4.6

== Bandwidth-limited regime ==
In the bandwidth-limited regime ($\rho > 2~b/2D$, i.e. the domain of non-binary signaling), the effective coding gain $\gamma_\mathrm{eff}(A)$ of a signal set $A$ at a given target error rate $P_s(E)$ is defined as the difference in dB between the $SNR_\mathrm{norm}$ required to achieve the target $P_s(E)$ with $A$ and the $SNR_\mathrm{norm}$ required to achieve the target $P_s(E)$ with M-PAM or (M×M)-QAM (i.e. no coding). The nominal coding gain $\gamma_c(A)$ is defined as

$$\gamma_c(A) = {(2^\rho - 1)d^2_{\min} (A) \over 6E_s}.$$

This definition is normalized so that $\gamma_c(A) = 1$ for M-PAM or (M×M)-QAM. The UBE becomes

$$P_s(E) \approx K_s(A)Q\sqrt{3\gamma_c(A)SNR_\mathrm{norm}},$$

where $K_s(A)$ is the average number of nearest neighbors per two dimensions.

== See also ==
- Channel capacity
- Eb/N0
