= Sum (Unix) =

Unix command

sum
- Original author: Ken Thompson
- Developer: AT&T Bell Laboratories
- Release: November 3, 1971; 54 years ago
- Operating system: Unix, Unix-like, Inferno
- Platform: Cross-platform
- Type: Command
- License: coreutils: GPLv3+

sum is a legacy utility available on some Unix and Unix-like operating systems. This utility outputs a 16-bit checksum of each argument file, as well as the number of 1 KiB blocks, rounded up, that they occupy on the disk. Two different checksum algorithms are in use. POSIX abandoned sum in favor of cksum.

== Overview ==
The sum program is generally only useful for historical interest. It is not part of POSIX. Two algorithms are typically available: a BSD checksum and a SYSV checksum. Both are weaker than the already weak 32-bit CRC used by cksum.

The default algorithm on FreeBSD and GNU implementations is the BSD checksum. Switching between the two algorithms is done via command line options.

The two commonly used algorithms are as follows.

The BSD sum, -r in GNU sum and -o1 in FreeBSD cksum:

- Initialize checksum to 0
- For each byte of the input stream
  - Perform 16-bit bitwise right rotation by 1 bit on the checksum
  - Add the byte to the checksum, and apply modulo 2 ^ 16 to the result, thereby keeping it within 16 bits
- The result is a 16-bit checksum

The above algorithm appeared in Seventh Edition Unix.

The System V sum, -s in GNU sum and -o2 in FreeBSD cksum:

- checksum0 = sum of all bytes of the input stream modulo 2 ^ 32
- checksum1 = checksum0 modulo 2 ^ 16 + checksum0 / 2 ^ 16
- checksum = checksum1 modulo 2 ^16 + checksum1 / 2 ^ 16
- The result is a 16-bit checksum calculated from the initial 32-bit plain byte sum

== Syntax ==
The sum utility is invoked from the command line according to the following syntax:

sum [OPTION]... [FILE]...

with the possible option parameters being:

- -r
  - use BSD checksum algorithm, use 1K blocks (defeats -s)
- -s, --sysv
  - use SYSV checksum algorithm, use 512 bytes blocks
- --help
  - display the help screen and exit
- --version
  - output version information and exit

When no file parameter is given, or when FILE is -, the standard input is used as input file.

Example of use:

$ echo Hello > testfile
$ sum testfile
36978     1

Example of -s use in GNU sum:

$ echo Hello > testfile
$ sum -s testfile
510 1 testfile

Example of using standard input, -r and printf to avoid newline:

$ printf Hello | sum -r
08401     1

== See also ==
- GNU Core Utilities
- UnxUtils port to native Win32
