= ATLO =

Phase of a spacecraft project

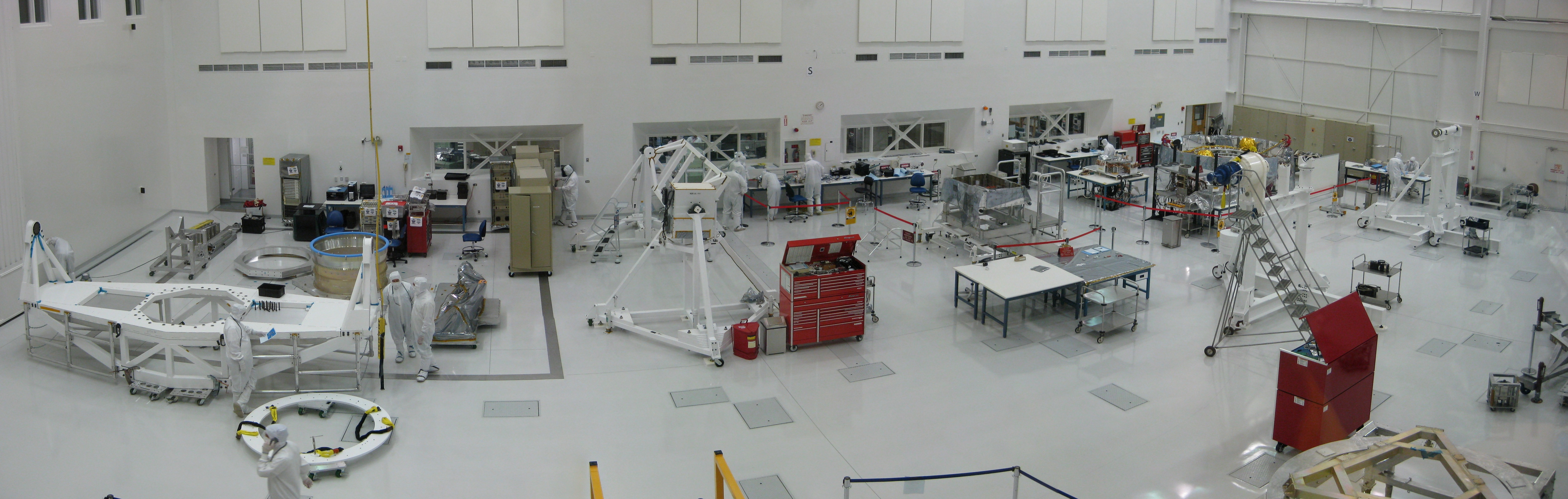
Mars Science Laboratory Assembly, Test and Launch Operations (ATLO) at JPL

In aerospace, Assembly, Test, and Launch Operations (ATLO), also known as Mission System Integration and Test (MSIT) is the phase of a spacecraft project that comprises building the spacecraft, testing it, and getting it launched.

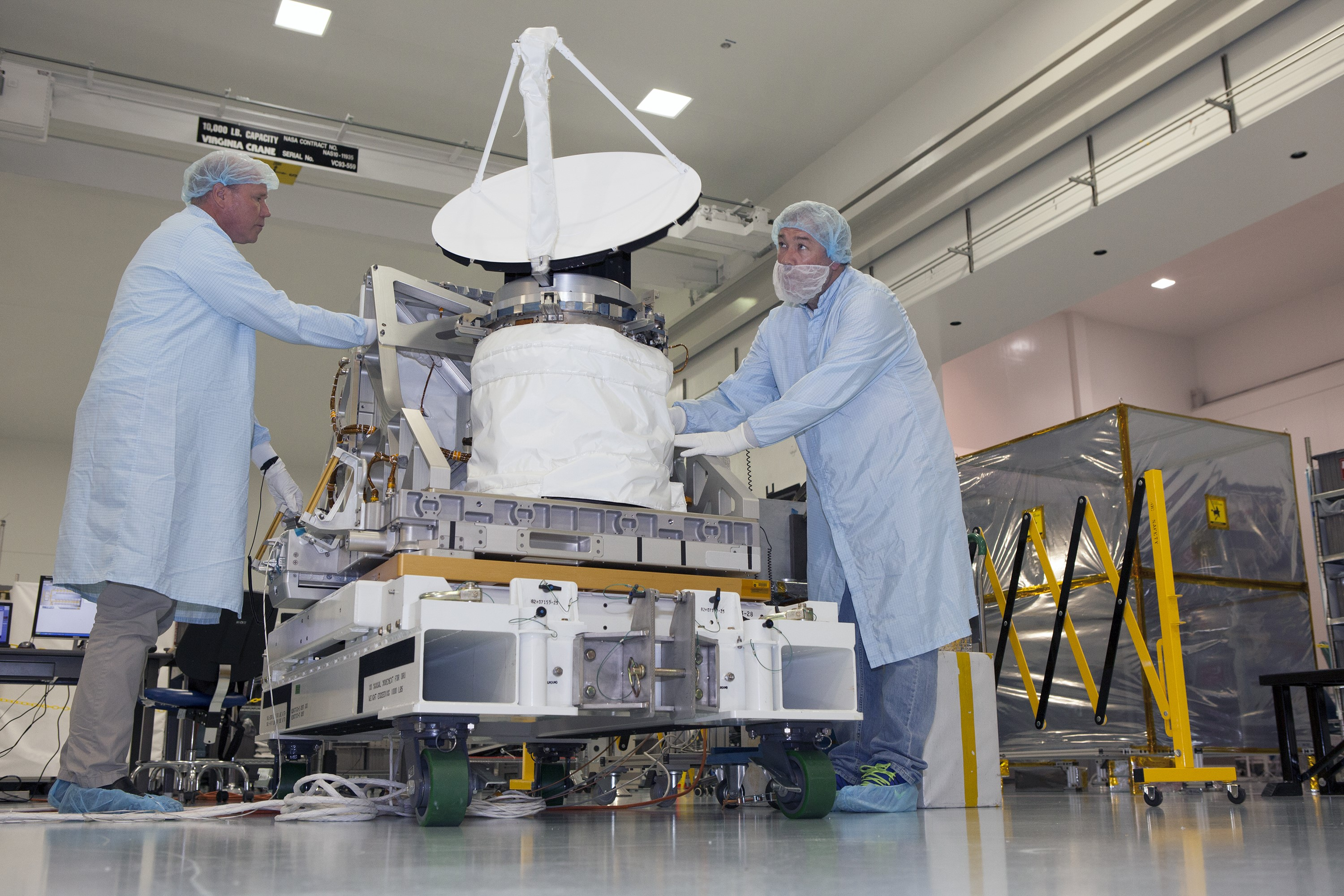
Project Manager John Wirth with Flight Technician Kieran McKay with NASA's ISS-RapidScat.

Pictured to the right is John Wirth (left) and Kieran McKay (right) at Kennedy Space Center with ISS-RapidScat, the radar scatterometer which was built at JPL. Specifically, they were testing the rotating radar's capabilities at the Space Station Processing Facility.
