= Asmutils =

- Stable release: 0.18 / 18 February 2006; 19 years ago
- Written in: i386 assembler
- Operating system: Unix-like
- Size: 353 Kilobyte
- License: GNU GPL version 2
- Website: asm.sourceforge.net/asmutils.html

Asmutils is a rewrite of the standard Unix commands in x86 assembly language aimed to have smallest possible size of ELF executables. All standard Unix commands (ls, cat, sh, etc.) executables are less than one kilobyte in size.

Asmutils is available for Linux, UnixWare, Solaris, FreeBSD, OpenBSD and AtheOS and is licensed under the GNU GPL version 2.

Linux mini distributions based entirely on asmutils are a-Linux and SAMEL Linux. Some utilities from asmutils are included in MuLinux and Lepton.
