= Unix2dos =

Text file character conversion program

unix2dos & dos2unix
- Original author: John Birchfield
- Developers: Benjamin Lin, Bernd Johannes Wuebben, Christian Wurll, Erwin Waterlander
- Release: 1989; 37 years ago
- Stable release: 7.5.7 / 27 August 2026; 2 months ago
- Operating system: Unix-like, DOS, OS/2, Windows
- Platform: Cross-platform
- Type: Command
- License: FreeBSD style license
- Website: waterlander.net/dos2unix/
- Repository: git.code.sf.net/p/dos2unix/dos2unix

unix2dos (sometimes named todos or u2d) is a tool to convert line breaks in a text file from Unix format (Line feed) to DOS format (carriage return + Line feed) and vice versa. When invoked as unix2dos the program will convert a Unix text file to DOS format, when invoked as dos2unix it will convert a DOS text file to Unix format.

== Usage ==
Unix2dos and dos2unix are not part of the Unix standard. Commercial Unixes usually come with their own implementation of unix2dos/dos2unix, like SunOS/Solaris's dos2unix/unix2dos, HP-UX's dos2ux/ux2dos and Irix's to_unix/to_dos.

There exist many open source alternatives with different command names and options like dos2unix/unix2dos, d2u/u2d, fromdos/todos, endlines, flip. The multi-call binary busybox includes an implementation of unix2dos/dos2unix.

See the manual page of the respective commands.

== Alternatives to unix2dos conversion ==
- recode
  $ recode latin1..dos file
- Open the file with Windows Write (WordPad) or Microsoft Word, and save in "plain text" format.
- Similar results can be achieved with different Unix tools to change the trailing newline '\n' to a combination of carriage return and newline characters '\r\n', for example with perl or the GNU implementation of sed in-line editing:
  - $ perl -i -p -e 's|[\r\n]+|\r\n|g' file
  - $ sed -i -n -z 's/\r*\n/\r\n/g;p' file

== Alternatives to dos2unix conversion ==
For the opposite conversion (dos2unix) it is possible to use, for example, the utility tr with the -d '\r' flag to remove the carriage return characters:

- $ tr -d '\r' < file > file2 # For ASCII and other files which do not contain multibyte characters (Not utf-8 safe).
- $ perl -i -p -e 's/\r//g' file
- $ sed -i -e 's/\r//g' file

Note: The above method assumes there are only DOS line breaks in the input file. Any Mac line breaks (\r) present in the input will be removed.

An alternative to the dos2unix conversion is possible by using the col command that is available on Linux and other Unix-like operating systems, including Mac OS X. In the following case, InFile contains the undesired DOS (^M) line endings. After execution, OutFile is either created or replaced, and contains UNIX line endings. The -b option tells col not to output backspace characters.

$ col -b < InFile > OutFile

== See also ==
- Newline
