= Joint source and channel coding =

Performing source coding and channel coding in a single operation

In information theory, joint source–channel coding is the encoding of a redundant information source for transmission over a noisy channel, and the corresponding decoding, using a single code instead of the more conventional steps of source coding followed by channel coding.

Joint source–channel coding has been proposed and implemented for a variety of situations, including speech and videotransmission.
