= Jean-Loup Gailly =

Computer programmer

- Born: 1956 (age 69–70)
- Known for: gzip
- Website: http://gailly.net/

Jean-Loup Gailly (born 1956) is a French computer scientist and an author of gzip. He wrote the compression code of the portable archiver of the Info-ZIP and the tools compatible with the PKZIP archiver for MS-DOS. He worked on zlib in collaboration with Mark Adler.

He wrote a chapter on fractal image compression for Mark Nelson's The Data Compression Book.

From 1981 to 1989 he worked as a senior developer on Ada compilers for Alsys.

From 1990 to 1995, while working for Chorus Systèmes SA, he designed the real-time executive of the ChorusOS microkernel.

From 1999 to 2001, he was the CTO of Mandrakesoft.

From 2006 to 2014, he worked at Google as a Tech Lead Manager.
