= Shaping codes =

Improved efficiency encoding

In digital communications shaping codes are a method of encoding that changes the distribution of signals to improve efficiency.

== Description ==
Typical digital communication systems uses M-quadrature amplitude modulation (QAM) to communicate through an analog channel (specifically a communication channel with Gaussian noise). For higher bit rates (M) the minimum signal-to-noise ratio (SNR) required by a QAM system with Error Correcting Codes is about 1.53 dB higher than minimum SNR required by a Gaussian source(>30% more transmitter power) as given in the Shannon–Hartley theorem

$$C =  B \log_2 \left( 1+\frac{S}{N} \right)$$

where:

C is the channel capacity in bits per second;
B is the bandwidth of the channel in hertz;
S is the total signal power over the bandwidth and
N is the total noise power over the bandwidth.
S/N is the signal-to-noise ratio of the communication signal to the Gaussian noise interference expressed as a straight power ratio rather than in decibels.

This 1.53 dB difference is known as the shaping gap. Typically, a digital system will encode bits with uniform probability to maximize the entropy. Shaping codes act as a buffer between digital sources and the modulator. They will receive uniformly distributed data and convert it to a Gaussian-like distribution before presenting it to the modulator. Shaping codes are helpful in reducing transmit power and thus reducing the cost of the power amplifier and the interference caused to other users in the vicinity.

== Application ==
Some of the methods used for shaping are described in the trellis shaping paper by Dr. G. D. Forney Jr.

Shell mapping, a technique used in signal shaping, is employed in V.34 modems to achieve a shaping gain of approximately 0.8 dB. Most shaping techniques described in the literature seek to reduce transmitted signal power while maintaining the same information rate. Such techniques may also find applications in wireless networks where interference from other nodes is the principal limitation.
