= Md5sum =

Software that verifies hashes

md5sum
- Original authors: Ulrich Drepper, Scott Miller, David Madore
- Operating system: Unix and Unix-like
- Platform: Cross-platform
- Type: Command
- License: coreutils: GNU GPL v3

md5sum is a computer program that calculates and verifies 128-bit MD5 hashes, as described in RFC 1321. The MD5 hash functions as a compact digital fingerprint of a file. As with all such hashing algorithms, there is theoretically an unlimited number of files that will have any given MD5 hash. However, it is very unlikely that any two non-identical files in the real world will have the same MD5 hash, unless they have been specifically created to do so.

The underlying MD5 algorithm is no longer deemed secure. Thus, while md5sum is well-suited for identifying known files in situations that are not security related, it should not be relied on if there is a chance that files have been purposely and maliciously tampered. In the latter case, the use of a newer hashing tool such as sha256sum is recommended.

md5sum is used to verify the integrity of files, as virtually any change to a file will cause its MD5 hash to change. Most commonly, md5sum is used to verify that a file has not changed as a result of a faulty file transfer, a disk error or non-malicious meddling. The md5sum program is included in most Unix-like operating systems or compatibility layers such as Cygwin.

The original C code was written by Ulrich Drepper and extracted from a 2001 release of glibc.

== Examples ==
All of the following files are assumed to be in the current directory.

=== Create MD5 hash file hash.md5 ===
$ md5sum filetohashA.txt filetohashB.txt filetohashC.txt > hash.md5

==== File produced ====
File contains hash and filename pairs:

$ cat hash.md5
595f44fec1e92a71d3e9e77456ba80d1  filetohashA.txt
71f920fa275127a7b60fa4d4d41432a3  filetohashB.txt
43c191bf6d6c3f263a8cd0efd4a058ab  filetohashC.txt

Please note:

- There must be two spaces or a space and an asterisk between each md5sum value and filename to be compared (the second space indicates text mode, the asterisk binary mode). Otherwise, the following error will result: no properly formatted MD5 checksum lines found. Many programs don't distinguish between the two modes, but some utils do.
- The file must also be UNIX line ending formatted, otherwise this will be seen: md5sum: WARNING: x listed files could not be read. dos2unix will convert it quickly if it is DOS/Windows formatted.

=== Check MD5 ===
$ md5sum -c hash.md5
filetohashA.txt: OK
filetohashB.txt: OK
filetohashC.txt: OK

=== Check single MD5 ===
$ echo 'D43F2404CA13E22594E5C8B04D3BBB81  filetohashA.txt' | md5sum -c
filetohashA.txt: OK

== On non-GNU systems ==
md5sum is specific to systems that use GNU coreutils or a clone such as BusyBox. On FreeBSD and OpenBSD the utilities are called md5, sha1, sha256, and sha512. These versions offer slightly different options and features. Additionally, FreeBSD offers the "SKEIN" family of message digests.

== See also ==
- cksum
- sha1sum
