= Parvaresh–Vardy code =

Group of error-correcting codes

Parvaresh–Vardy codes are a family of error-correcting codes first described in 2005 by Farzad Parvaresh and Alexander Vardy. They can be used for efficient list-decoding.

== See also ==
- Reed–Solomon code
- Folded Reed–Solomon code
