= Lloyd R. Welch =

American information theorist (1927–2023)

- Born: September 28, 1927
- Died: December 28, 2023 (aged 96)
- Known for: Baum–Welch algorithm, Berlekamp–Welch algorithm
- Awards: National Academy of Engineering, IEEE Fellow, Claude E. Shannon Award

Lloyd Richard Welch (September 28, 1927 – December 28, 2023) was an American information theorist and applied mathematician, and co-inventor of the Baum–Welch algorithm and the Berlekamp–Welch algorithm, also known as the Welch–Berlekamp algorithm.

Welch received his B.S. in mathematics from the University of Illinois, 1951, and Ph.D. in mathematics from the California Institute of Technology, 1958, under advisor Frederic Bohnenblust. He worked at the Jet Propulsion Laboratory 1956–1959, Institute for Defense Analyses in Princeton, 1959–1965, and University of Southern California, 1965–1999. He was elected a member of the National Academy of Engineering in 1979 for "contributions to an understanding of possibilities, limitations, and design of communications coding for reliability, security, and synchronization". He was also an IEEE Fellow, and received the 2003 Claude E. Shannon Award.
