= Robert Tienwen Chien =

American computer scientist

- 錢天問
- Born: Robert Tienwen Chien; November 20, 1931; Wuxi, Jiangsu, China
- Died: December 8, 1983 (aged 52); Urbana, Illinois, U.S.
- Education: National Taiwan University (BS); University of Illinois at Urbana–Champaign (MA, PhD)
- Known for: Chien search
- Awards: IBM First Invention Award (1964); IEEE Fellow (1972)
- Scientific career
- Workplaces: Thomas J. Watson Research Center; University of Illinois Urbana-Champaign
- Thesis: Synthesis of Active Networks With Negative Impedance Converters (1958)

Robert Tienwen Chien (Chinese: 錢天問; November 20, 1931 – December 8, 1983) was an American computer scientist who was the director of the Coordinated Science Laboratory at the University of Illinois Urbana-Champaign. Chein was known for his invention of the Chien search.

== Biography ==
Robert Tienwen Chien was born in Wuxi, Jiangsu, China as the youngest of eight children, and emigrated to the United States in 1952 to continue his technical studies, He received his B.S. in electrical engineering in 1954 from the University of Illinois Urbana-Champaign, and continued graduate studies at Illinois, receiving his A.M in Mathematics in 1957, and his Ph.D. in electrical engineering in 1958.

He worked as a research scientist at IBM's Thomas J. Watson Research Center, where he rose to the position of Group Manager. While at IBM, he also taught as an adjunct professor at Columbia University, and authored several books on coding theory. In 1964, he left IBM to join the University of Illinois Urbana-Champaign as an associate professor in electrical engineering, rising to the rank of full professor in 1966. In 1969, he served as the E. A. Guillemin Visiting Professor at the University of Maryland, College Park, and in 1972, he served as a visiting professor at the Massachusetts Institute of Technology. He was appointed the director of the Coordinated Science Laboratory at Illinois in 1973, a role he held until his death in 1983.

In recognition of his contributions, the Electrical and Computer Engineering Department of the University of Illinois annually presents the Robert T. Chien Memorial Award for demonstrated research excellence to a PhD candidate in Electrical Engineering. In addition, the Coordinated Science Laboratory at the University of Illinois also invites extraordinary researchers to give the Robert T. Chien Distinguished Lecture each year. Notably, while CSL director, he created an Outstanding Staff Award, the first such recognition of this type at the University of Illinois. In appreciation that award also bears his name as the Robert T. Chien Staff Appreciation Award, and is awarded each year to an outstanding staff member selected by the staff.

== Contributions in Computer Science ==
Chien is best known for two seminal contributions, the Chien Search, a fast algorithm for determining the roots of a polynomial over a finite field and a model system-level fault diagnosis, known today as the PMC (Preparata-Metze-Chien) model, which is a main issue in the design of highly dependable processing systems.

== Awards and affiliations ==
Chien was affiliated with the following organizations:

- Fellow of the Institute of Electrical and Electronics Engineers
- Board of Governors, IEEE Information Society
- Editorial Board, IEEE Spectrum Magazine
- Trustee, National Electronics Conference
