= Venkatesan Guruswami =

Indian computer scientist (born 1976)

- Born: 1976 (age 49–50); India
- Education: IIT Madras; Massachusetts Institute of Technology
- Awards: Presburger Award (2012)
- Scientific career
- Fields: Computer Science
- Workplaces: Simons Institute for the Theory of Computing; University of California, Berkeley; Carnegie Mellon University
- Thesis: List decoding of error-correcting codes (2001)
- Doctoral advisor: Madhu Sudan

Venkatesan Guruswami (born 1976) is a senior scientist at the Simons Institute for the Theory of Computing and Professor of EECS and Mathematics at the University of California, Berkeley. He did his high schooling at Padma Seshadri Bala Bhavan in Chennai, India. He completed his undergraduate in Computer Science from IIT Madras and his doctorate from Massachusetts Institute of Technology under the supervision of Madhu Sudan in 2001. After receiving his PhD, he spent a year at UC Berkeley as a Miller Fellow, and then was a member of the faculty at the University of Washington from 2002 to 2009. His primary area of research is computer science, and in particular on error-correcting codes. During 2007–2008, he visited the Institute for Advanced Study as a Member of School of Mathematics. He also visited SCS at Carnegie Mellon University during 2008–09 as a visiting faculty. From July 2009 through December 2020 he was a faculty member in the Computer Science Department in the School of Computer Science at Carnegie Mellon University.

== Recognition ==
Guruswami was awarded the 2002 ACM Doctoral Dissertation Award for his dissertation List Decoding of Error-Correcting Codes, which introduced an algorithm that allowed for the correction of errors beyond half the minimum distance of the code. It applies to Reed–Solomon codes and more generally to algebraic geometry codes. This algorithm produces a list of codewords (it is a list-decoding algorithm) and is based on interpolation and factorization of polynomials over $GF(2^m)$ and its extensions.

He was an invited speaker in International Congress of Mathematicians 2010, Hyderabad on the topic of "Mathematical Aspects of Computer Science."

Guraswami was one of two winners of the 2012 Presburger Award, given by the European Association for Theoretical Computer Science for outstanding contributions by a young theoretical computer scientist. He was elected as an ACM Fellow in 2017, as an IEEE Fellow in 2019, and to the 2023 class of Fellows of the American Mathematical Society, "for contributions to the theory of computing and error-correcting codes, and for service to the profession".

== Selected publications ==
- Guruswami, Venkatesan (2004). List Decoding of Error-Correcting Codes. Lecture Notes in Computer Science. Springer. ISBN 978-3-540-24051-8.
- Guruswami, Venkatesan; Sudan, Madhu (1999). "Improved decoding of Reed-Solomon and algebraic-geometry codes". IEEE Transactions on Information Theory. 45 (6): 1757–1767. doi:10.1109/18.782097.

== See also ==
- Guruswami–Sudan list decoding algorithm
