= Alexander Vardy =

Russian engineer

Alexander Vardy (Russian: Александр Варды, Hebrew: אלכסנדר וארדי; 12 November 1963 - 11 March 2022) was a Russian-born and Israeli-educated electrical engineer known for his expertise in coding theory. He held the Jack Keil Wolf Endowed Chair in Electrical Engineering at the University of California, San Diego. The Parvaresh–Vardy codes are named after him.

Vardy was born in Moscow in 1963. He graduated from the Technion – Israel Institute of Technology in 1985, and completed his Ph.D. in 1991 at Tel Aviv University. During his graduate studies, he also worked on electronic countermeasures for the Israeli Air Force, attaining the rank of Seren (Captain). He became a researcher at the IBM Almaden Research Center for two years, then became a faculty member of the University of Illinois at Urbana–Champaign before moving to UCSD in 1996. He served as editor-in-chief of the IEEE Transactions on Information Theory from 1998 to 2001.

In 2004 a paper by Ralf Koetter and Vardy on decoding Reed–Solomon codes was listed by the IEEE Information Theory Society as the best paper in information theory of the previous two years; the resulting decoding algorithm has become known as the Koetter–Vardy algorithm. Vardy was named a fellow of the Institute of Electrical and Electronics Engineers in 1999. He became the Jack Wolf Professor in 2013. He was elected as an ACM Fellow in 2017.

Vardy died on March 11, 2022, at the age of 58.
