= Berlekamp–Welch algorithm =

Error-correcting algorithm

The Berlekamp–Welch algorithm, also known as the Welch–Berlekamp algorithm, is named for Elwyn R. Berlekamp and Lloyd R. Welch. This is a decoder algorithm that efficiently corrects errors in Reed–Solomon codes for an RS(n, k), code based on the Reed Solomon original view where a message $m_1, \cdots, m_k$ is used as coefficients of a polynomial $F(a_i)$ or used with Lagrange interpolation to generate the polynomial $F(a_i)$ of degree < k for inputs $a_1 , \cdots, a_k$ and then $F(a_i)$ is applied to $a_{k+1}, \cdots , a_n$ to create an encoded codeword $c_1, \cdots , c_n$.

The goal of the decoder is to recover the original encoding polynomial $F(a_i)$, using the known inputs $a_1, \cdots , a_n$ and received codeword $b_1, \cdots , b_n$ with possible errors. It also computes an error polynomial $E(a_i)$ where $E(a_i) = 0$ corresponding to errors in the received codeword.

== The key equations ==
Defining e = number of errors, the key set of n equations is

$$b_i E(a_i) = E(a_i) F(a_i)$$

Where E(a_{i}) = 0 for the e cases when b_{i} ≠ F(a_{i}), and E(a_{i}) ≠ 0 for the n - e non error cases where b_{i} = F(a_{i}) . These equations can't be solved directly, but by defining Q() as the product of E() and F():

$$Q(a_i) = E(a_i) F(a_i)$$

and adding the constraint that the most significant coefficient of E(a_{i}) = e_{e} = 1, the result will lead to a set of equations that can be solved with linear algebra.

$$b_i E(a_i) = Q(a_i)$$
$$b_i E(a_i) - Q(a_i) = 0$$
$$b_i(e_0 + e_1 a_i + e_2 a_i^2 + \cdots + e_e a_i^e) -(q_0 + q_1 a_i + q_2 a_i^2 + \cdots + q_q a_i^q) = 0$$

where q = n - e - 1. Since e_{e} is constrained to be 1, the equations become:

$$b_i(e_0 + e_1 a_i + e_2 a_i^2 + \cdots + e_{e-1} a_i^{e-1}) -(q_0 + q_1 a_i + q_2 a_i^2 + \cdots + q_q a_i^q) = - b_i a_i^e$$

resulting in a set of equations which can be solved using linear algebra, with time complexity $O(n^3)$.

The algorithm begins assuming the maximum number of errors e = ⌊(n-k)/2⌋. If the equations can not be solved (due to redundancy), e is reduced by 1 and the process repeated, until the equations can be solved or e is reduced to 0, indicating no errors. If Q()/E() has remainder = 0, then F() = Q()/E() and the code word values F(a_{i}) are calculated for the locations where E(a_{i}) = 0 to recover the original code word. If the remainder ≠ 0, then an uncorrectable error has been detected.

== Simple Example ==
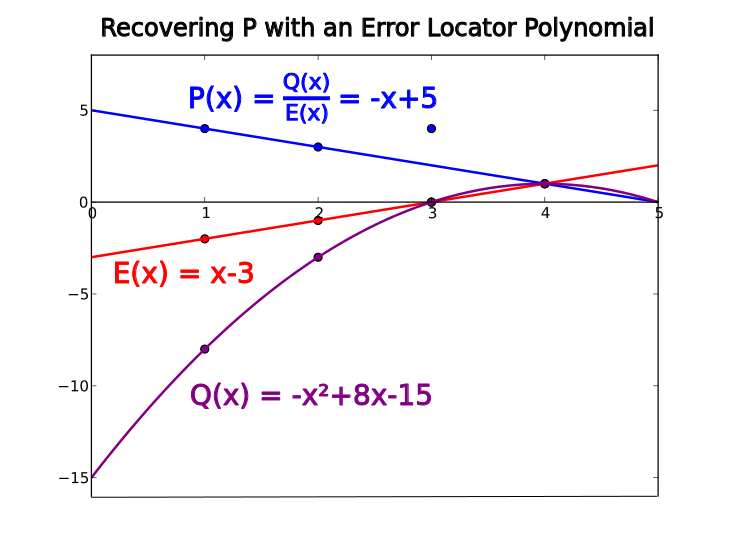
The error locator polynomial serves to "neutralize" errors in P by making Q zero at those points, so that the system of linear equations is not affected by the inaccuracy in the input.

Consider a simple example where a redundant set of points are used to represent the line $y = 5 - x$, and one of the points is incorrect. The points that the algorithm gets as an input are $(1,4), (2,3), (3,4), (4,1)$, where $(3,4)$ is the defective point. The algorithm must solve the following system of equations:

$$\begin{alignat}{1}
Q(1) & = 4*E(1) \\
Q(2) & = 3*E(2) \\
Q(3) & = 4*E(3) \\
Q(4) & = 1*E(4) \\
\end{alignat}$$

Given a solution $Q$ and $E$ to this system of equations, it is evident that at any of the points $x = 1,2,3,4$ one of the following must be true: either $Q(x_i) = E(x_i) = 0$, or $P(x_i) = {Q(x_i) \over E(x_i)} = y_i$. Since $E$ is defined as only having a degree of one, the former can only be true in one point. Therefore, $P(x_i)$ must equal $y_i$ at the three other points.

Letting $E(x) = x + e_0$ and $Q(x) = q_0 + q_1x + q_2x^2$ and bringing $E(x)$ to the left, we can rewrite the system thus:

$$\begin{alignat}{10}
q_0 & + & q_1 & + & q_2 & - & 4e_0 & - & 4 & = & 0 \\
q_0 & + & 2q_1 & + & 4q_2 & - & 3e_0 & - & 6 & = & 0 \\
q_0 & + & 3q_1 & + & 9q_2 & - & 4e_0 & - & 12 & = & 0 \\
q_0 & + & 4q_1 & + & 16q_2 & - & e_0 & - & 4 & = & 0
\end{alignat}$$

This system can be solved through Gaussian elimination, and gives the values:

$$q_0 = -15, q_1 = 8, q_2 = -1, e_0 = -3$$

Thus, $Q(x) = -x^2 + 8x - 15, E(x) = x - 3$. Dividing the two gives:

$${Q(x) \over E(x)} = P(x) = 5-x$$

$5-x$ fits three of the four points given, so it is the most likely to be the original polynomial.

== Example ==
Consider RS(7,3) (n = 7, k = 3) defined in GF(7) with α = 3 and input values: a_{i} = i-1 : {0,1,2,3,4,5,6}. The message to be systematically encoded is {1,6,3}. Using Lagrange interpolation, F(a_{i}) = 3 x^{2} + 2 x + 1, and applying F(a_{i}) for a_{4} = 3 to a_{7} = 6, results in the code word {1,6,3,6,1,2,2}. Assume errors occur at c_{2} and c_{5} resulting in the received code word {1,5,3,6,3,2,2}. Start off with e = 2 and solve the linear equations:

$$\begin{bmatrix}
b_1 & b_1 a_1 & -1 & -a_1 & -a_1^2 & -a_1^3 & -a_1^4 \\
b_2 & b_2 a_2 & -1 & -a_2 & -a_2^2 & -a_2^3 & -a_2^4 \\
b_3 & b_3 a_3 & -1 & -a_3 & -a_3^2 & -a_3^3 & -a_3^4 \\
b_4 & b_4 a_4 & -1 & -a_4 & -a_4^2 & -a_4^3 & -a_4^4 \\
b_5 & b_5 a_5 & -1 & -a_5 & -a_5^2 & -a_5^3 & -a_5^4 \\
b_6 & b_6 a_6 & -1 & -a_6 & -a_6^2 & -a_6^3 & -a_6^4 \\
b_7 & b_7 a_7 & -1 & -a_7 & -a_7^2 & -a_7^3 & -a_7^4 \\
\end{bmatrix}
\begin{bmatrix}
e_0 \\ e_1 \\ q0 \\ q1 \\ q2 \\ q3 \\ q4 \\
\end{bmatrix}
=
\begin{bmatrix}
-b_1 a_1^2\\
-b_2 a_2^2\\
-b_3 a_3^2\\
-b_4 a_4^2\\
-b_5 a_5^2\\
-b_6 a_6^2\\
-b_7 a_7^2\\
\end{bmatrix}$$

$$\begin{bmatrix}
1 & 0 & 6 & 0 & 0 & 0 & 0 \\
5 & 5 & 6 & 6 & 6 & 6 & 6 \\
3 & 6 & 6 & 5 & 3 & 6 & 5 \\
6 & 4 & 6 & 4 & 5 & 1 & 3 \\
3 & 5 & 6 & 3 & 5 & 6 & 3 \\
2 & 3 & 6 & 2 & 3 & 1 & 5 \\
2 & 5 & 6 & 1 & 6 & 1 & 6 \\
\end{bmatrix}
\begin{bmatrix}
e_0 \\ e_1 \\ q0 \\ q1 \\ q2 \\ q3 \\ q4 \\
\end{bmatrix}
=
\begin{bmatrix}
0\\
2\\
2\\
2\\
1\\
6\\
5\\
\end{bmatrix}$$

$$\begin{bmatrix}
1 & 0 & 0 & 0 & 0 & 0 & 0 \\
0 & 1 & 0 & 0 & 0 & 0 & 0 \\
0 & 0 & 1 & 0 & 0 & 0 & 0 \\
0 & 0 & 0 & 1 & 0 & 0 & 0 \\
0 & 0 & 0 & 0 & 1 & 0 & 0 \\
0 & 0 & 0 & 0 & 0 & 1 & 0 \\
0 & 0 & 0 & 0 & 0 & 0 & 1 \\
\end{bmatrix}
\begin{bmatrix}
e_0 \\ e_1 \\ q0 \\ q1 \\ q2 \\ q3 \\ q4 \\
\end{bmatrix}
=
\begin{bmatrix}
4\\
2\\
4\\
3\\
3\\
1\\
3\\
\end{bmatrix}$$

Starting from the bottom of the right matrix, and the constraint e_{2} = 1:

$Q(a_i) = 3 x^4 + 1 x^3 + 3 x^2 + 3x + 4$

$E(a_i) = 1 x^2 + 2 x + 4$

$F(a_i) = Q(a_i) / E(a_i) = 3 x^2 + 2 x + 1$ with remainder = 0.

E(a_{i}) = 0 at a_{2} = 1 and a_{5} = 4 Calculate F(a_{2} = 1) = 6 and F(a_{5} = 4) = 1 to produce corrected code word {1,6,3,6,1,2,2}.

== See also ==
- Reed–Solomon error correction
