= Madhu Sudan =

Indian-American computer scientist (born 1966)

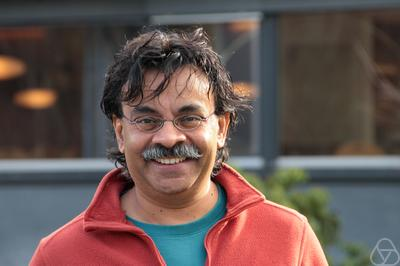
- Sudan at Oberwolfach in 2015
- Born: 12 September 1966 (age 59); Madras, India
- Education: IIT Delhi (BTech); University of California, Berkeley (PhD)
- Awards: Gödel Prize (2001); Nevanlinna Prize (2002); Infosys Prize (2014); IEEE Richard W. Hamming Medal (2022)
- Scientific career
- Thesis: Efficient Checking of Polynomials and Proofs and the Hardness of Approximation Problems (1992)
- Doctoral advisor: Umesh Vazirani
- Doctoral students: Venkatesan Guruswami; Benjamin Rossman; Ryan O'Donnell; Adam D. Smith

Madhu Sudan (born 12 September 1966) is an Indian-American computer scientist. He has been a Gordon McKay Professor of Computer Science at the Harvard John A. Paulson School of Engineering and Applied Sciences since 2015.

== Career ==
He received his bachelor's degree in computer science from IIT Delhi in 1987 and his doctoral degree in computer science at the University of California, Berkeley in 1992. The dissertation he wrote at the University of California, Berkeley is titled Efficient Checking of Polynomials and Proofs and the Hardness of Approximation Problems. He was a research staff member at the IBM Thomas J. Watson Research Center in Yorktown Heights, New York from 1992 to 1997 and became a researcher at the Massachusetts Institute of Technology (MIT) after that. From 2009 to 2015 he was a permanent researcher at Microsoft Research New England before joining the Harvard University faculty in 2015.

== Research contribution and awards ==
In 1998, he received the Sloan Research Fellowship. He was awarded the Rolf Nevanlinna Prize at the 24th International Congress of Mathematicians (ICM) in 2002. The prize recognizes outstanding work in the mathematical aspects of computer science. Sudan was honored for his work in advancing the theory of probabilistically checkable proofs—a way to recast a mathematical proof in computer language for additional checks on its validity—and developing error-correcting codes. For the same work, he received the ACM's Distinguished Doctoral Dissertation Award in 1993 and the Gödel Prize in 2001 and was an Invited Speaker of the ICM in 1998. He is a Fellow of the ACM (2008). In 2012 he became a fellow of the American Mathematical Society. In 2014 he won the Infosys Prize in the mathematical sciences. In 2017 he was elected to the National Academy of Sciences. In 2021, he was awarded the IEEE Richard W. Hamming Medal for 2022.

Sudan has made important contributions to several areas of theoretical computer science, including probabilistically checkable proofs, non-approximability of optimization problems, list decoding, and error-correcting codes.
