= Alexis Hocquenghem =

French mathematician

Alexis Hocquenghem (14 January 1908 – 17 April 1990) was a French mathematician. He is known for his discovery of Bose–Chaudhuri–Hocquenghem codes, better known under the acronym BCH codes. BCH codes are a class of error correcting codes that were published by Hocquenghem in 1959, and bear the names of mathematicians R. C. Bose and D. K. Ray-Chaudhuri, who independently discovered these codes and published that result shortly afterwards, in 1960.
