= Julius August Christoph Zech =

German astronomer and mathematician

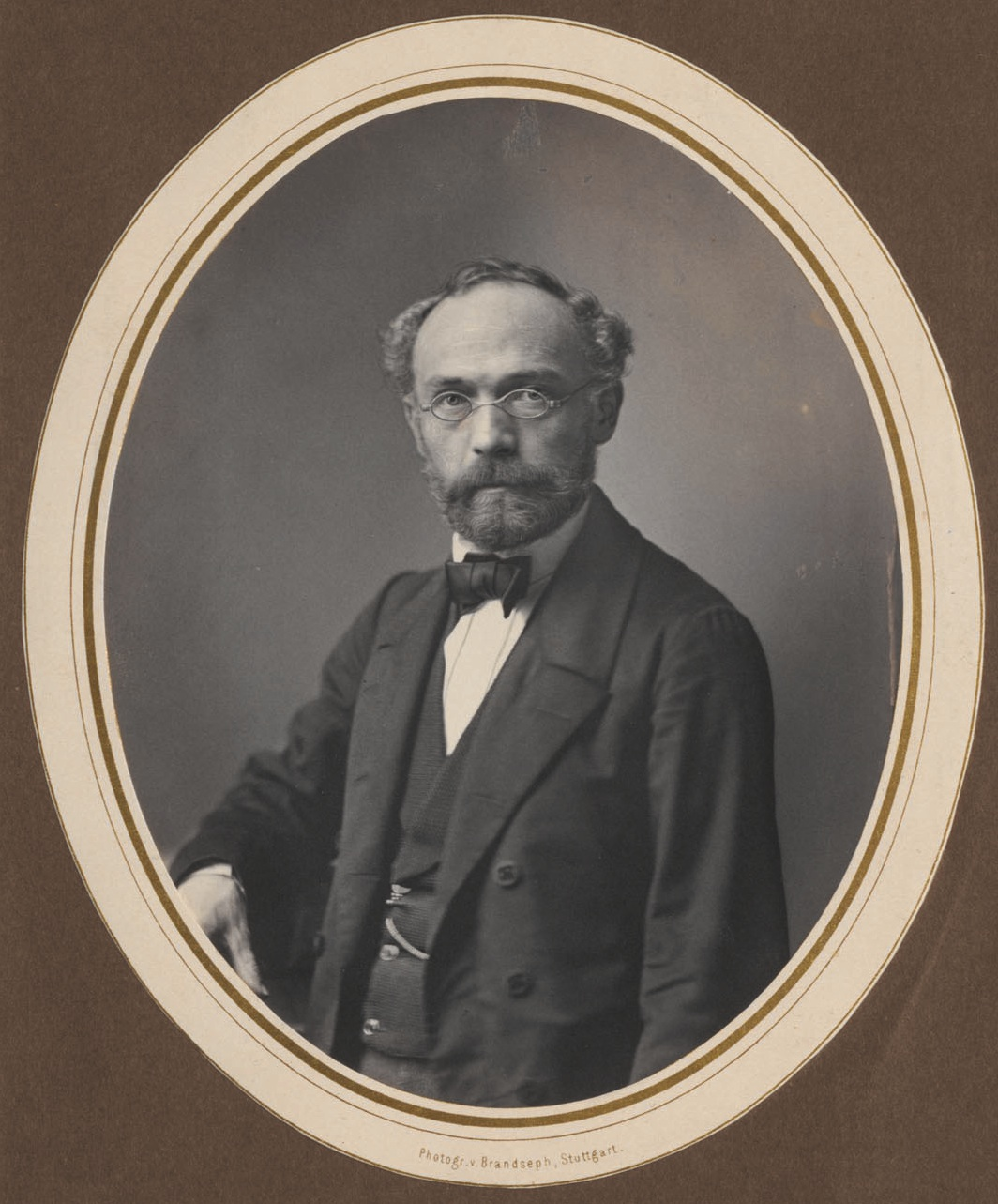
Julius Zech, photography by Georg Friedrich Brandseph, before 1862

Julius August Christoph Zech (24 February 1821 in Stuttgart, Germany − 13 July 1864 in Berg) was a German astronomer and mathematician.

In 1849, Zech published a table of logarithms; as a result, Zech logarithms for finite fields are named after him.

In 1863, Zech attended the founding meeting of the Astronomische Gesellschaft (German Astronomical Society) and became its Vorstand (chairman). Friedrich Wilhelm Argelander assumed this role upon Zech's death.
