= CCRG =

CCRG may refer to:

- Center for Computational Relativity and Gravitation, Rochester Institute of Technology
- Central Cultural Revolution Group, China
- Charm City Roller Girls, Baltimore, Maryland
- Classic City Roller Girls, Athens, Georgia
- Climate Change Research Group, a division of the Royal Geographical Society
- Cognitive Computing Research Group, University of Memphis
