= HSLA =

HSLA may refer to:

- High-strength low-alloy steel
- Hue, saturation, lightness, alpha; see HSL and HSV
- High Speed Logarithmic Arithmetic, a European logarithmic research computer
