= Conway polynomial =

In mathematics, Conway polynomial can refer to:

- the Alexander–Conway polynomial in knot theory
- the Conway polynomial (finite fields)
- the polynomial of degree 71 that has Conway's constant as its single positive real root
