= Galois ring =

Type of finite commutative rings

In mathematics, Galois rings are a type of finite commutative rings which generalize both the finite fields and the rings of integers modulo a prime power. A Galois ring is constructed from the ring $\mathbb{Z}/p^n\mathbb{Z}$ similar to how a finite field $\mathbb{F}_{p^r}$ is constructed from $\mathbb{F}_p$. It is a Galois extension of $\mathbb{Z}/p^n\mathbb{Z}$, when the concept of a Galois extension is generalized beyond the context of fields.

Galois rings were studied by Krull (1924), and independently by Janusz (1966) and by Raghavendran (1969), who both introduced the name Galois ring. They are named after Évariste Galois, similar to Galois fields, which is another name for finite fields. Galois rings have found applications in coding theory, where certain codes are best understood as linear codes over $\Z / 4\Z$ using Galois rings GR(4, r).

== Definition ==
A Galois ring is a commutative ring of characteristic p^{n} which has p^{nr} elements, where p is prime and n and r are positive integers. It is usually denoted GR(p^{n}, r). It can be defined as a quotient ring

$$\operatorname{GR}(p^n, r) \cong \mathbb{Z}[x]/(p^n, f(x))$$

where $f(x) \in \Z[x]$ is a monic polynomial of degree r which is irreducible modulo p. Up to isomorphism, the ring depends only on p, n, and r and not on the choice of f used in the construction.

== Examples ==
The simplest examples of Galois rings are important special cases:

- The Galois ring GR(p^{n}, 1) is the ring of integers modulo p^{n}.
- The Galois ring GR(p, r) is the finite field of order p^{r}.

A less trivial example is the Galois ring GR(4, 3). It is of characteristic 4 and has 4^{3} = 64 elements. One way to construct it is $\mathbb{Z}[x]/(4, x^3 + 2x^2 + x - 1)$, or equivalently, $(\mathbb{Z}/4\mathbb{Z})[\xi]$ where $\xi$ is a root of the polynomial $f(x) = x^3 + 2x^2 + x - 1$. Although any monic polynomial of degree 3 which is irreducible modulo 2 could have been used, this choice of f turns out to be convenient because

$$x^7 - 1 = (x^3 + 2x^2 + x - 1)(x^3 - x^2 + 2x - 1)(x - 1)$$

in $(\mathbb{Z}/4\mathbb{Z})[x]$, which makes $\xi$ a 7th root of unity in GR(4, 3). The elements of GR(4, 3) can all be written in the form $a_2 \xi^2 + a_1 \xi + a_0$ where each of a_{0}, a_{1}, and a_{2} is in $\mathbb{Z}/4\mathbb{Z}$. For example, $\xi^3 = 2\xi^2 - \xi + 1$ and $\xi^4 = 2\xi^3 - \xi^2 + \xi = -\xi^2 - \xi + 2$.

== Structure ==
=== (p^{r} – 1)-th roots of unity ===
Every Galois ring GR(p^{n}, r) has a primitive (p^{r} – 1)-th root of unity. It is the equivalence class of x in the quotient $\mathbb{Z}[x]/(p^n, f(x))$ when f is chosen to be a primitive polynomial. This means that, in $(\mathbb{Z}/p^n\mathbb{Z})[x]$, the polynomial $f(x)$ divides $x^{p^r - 1} - 1$ and does not divide $x^m - 1$ for all m < p^{r} – 1. Such an f can be computed by starting with a primitive polynomial of degree r over the finite field $\mathbb{F}_p$ and using Hensel lifting.

A primitive (p^{r} – 1)-th root of unity $\xi$ can be used to express elements of the Galois ring in a useful form called the p-adic representation. Every element of the Galois ring can be written uniquely as

$$\alpha_0 + \alpha_1 p + \cdots + \alpha_{n-1} p^{n-1}$$

where each $\alpha_i$ is in the set $\{0, 1, \xi, \xi^2, ..., \xi^{p^r - 2}\}$.

=== Ideals, quotients, and subrings ===
Every Galois ring is a local ring. The unique maximal ideal is the principal ideal $(p) = p \operatorname{GR}(p^n, r)$, consisting of all elements which are multiples of p. The residue field $\operatorname{GR}(p^n, r)/(p)$ is isomorphic to the finite field of order p^{r}. Furthermore, $(0), (p^{n-1}), ..., (p), (1)$ are all the ideals.

The Galois ring GR(p^{n}, r) contains a unique subring isomorphic to GR(p^{n}, s) for every s which divides r. These are the only subrings of GR(p^{n}, r).

=== Group of units ===
The units of a Galois ring R are all the elements which are not multiples of p. The group of units, R^{×}, can be decomposed as a direct product G_{1}×G_{2}, as follows. The subgroup G_{1} is the group of (p^{r} − 1)-th roots of unity. It is a cyclic group of order p^{r} − 1. The subgroup G_{2} is 1+pR, consisting of all elements congruent to 1 modulo p. It is a group of order p^{r(n−1)}, with the following structure:

- if p is odd or if p = 2 and n ≤ 2, then $G_2 \cong (C_{p^{n-1}})^r$, the direct product of r copies of the cyclic group of order p^{n−1}
- if p = 2 and n ≥ 3, then $G_2 \cong C_2 \times C_{2^{n-2}} \times (C_{2^{n-1}})^{r-1}$

This description generalizes the structure of the multiplicative group of integers modulo p^{n}, which is the case r = 1.

=== Automorphisms ===
Analogous to the automorphisms of the finite field $\mathbb{F}_{p^r}$, the automorphism group of the Galois ring GR(p^{n}, r) is a cyclic group of order r. The automorphisms can be described explicitly using the p-adic representation. Specifically, the map

$$\phi(\alpha_0 + \alpha_1 p + \cdots + \alpha_{n-1} p^{n-1}) = \alpha_0^p + \alpha_1^p p + \cdots + \alpha_{n-1}^p p^{n-1}$$

(where each $\alpha_i$ is in the set $\{0, 1, \xi, \xi^2, ..., \xi^{p^r - 2}\}$) is an automorphism, which is called the generalized Frobenius automorphism. The fixed points of the generalized Frobenius automorphism are the elements of the subring $\mathbb{Z}/p^n\mathbb{Z}$. Iterating the generalized Frobenius automorphism gives all the automorphisms of the Galois ring.

The automorphism group can be thought of as the Galois group of GR(p^{n}, r) over $\mathbb{Z}/p^n\mathbb{Z}$, and the ring GR(p^{n}, r) is a Galois extension of $\mathbb{Z}/p^n\mathbb{Z}$. More generally, whenever r is a multiple of s, GR(p^{n}, r) is a Galois extension of GR(p^{n}, s), with Galois group isomorphic to $\operatorname{Gal}(\mathbb{F}_{p^r} / \mathbb{F}_{p^s})$.
