= Osipkov–Merritt model =

Mathematical representations of stellar systems

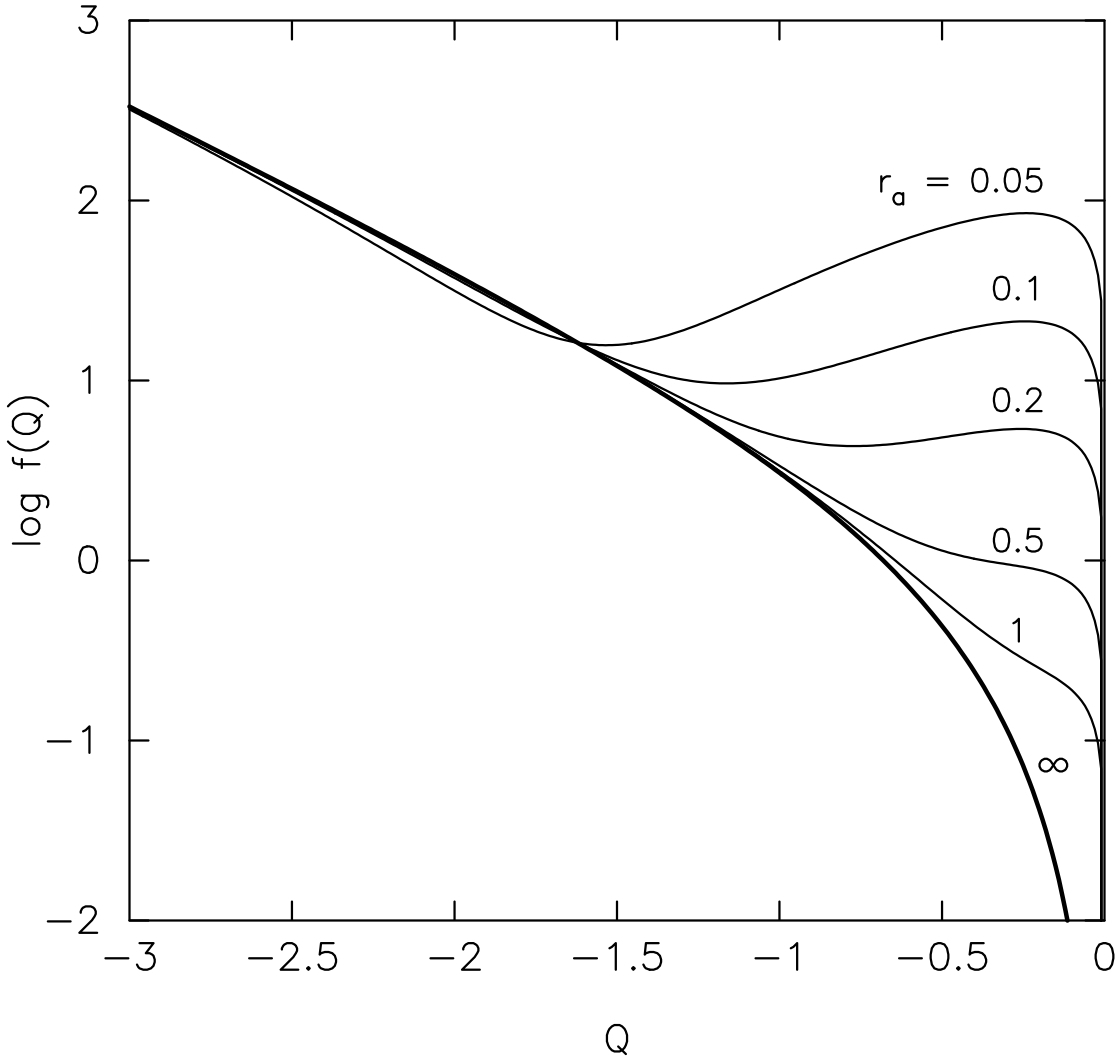
Osipkov-Merritt distribution functions, derived from galaxy models obeying Jaffe's law in the density. The isotropic model, $f=f(E)$, is plotted with the heavy line.

Osipkov–Merritt models (named for Leonid Osipkov and David Merritt) are mathematical representations of spherical stellar systems (galaxies, star clusters, globular clusters etc.). The Osipkov–Merritt formula generates a one-parameter family of phase-space distribution functions that reproduce a specified density profile (representing stars) in a specified gravitational potential (in which the stars move). The density and potential need not be self-consistently related. A free parameter adjusts the degree of velocity anisotropy, from isotropic to completely radial motions. The method is a generalization of Eddington's formula for constructing isotropic spherical models.

The method was derived independently by its two eponymous discoverers. The latter derivation includes two additional families of models (Type IIa, b) with tangentially anisotropic motions.

== Derivation ==
According to Jeans's theorem, the phase-space density of stars f must be expressible in terms of the isolating integrals of motion, which in a spherical stellar system are the energy E and the angular momentum J. The Osipkov-Merritt ansatz is

$$f = f(Q) = f(E+J^2/2r_a^2)$$

where r_{a}, the "anisotropy radius", is a free parameter. This ansatz implies that f is constant on spheroids in velocity space since

$$2Q = v_r^2 + (1+r^2/r_a^2)v_t^2 + 2\Phi(r)$$

where v_{r}, v_{t} are velocity components parallel and perpendicular to the radius vector r and Φ(r) is the gravitational potential.

The density ρ is the integral over velocities of f:

$$\rho(r) = 2\pi\int\int f(E,J) v_t dv_t dv_r$$

which can be written

$$\rho(r) = {2\pi\over r^2} \int_\Phi^0 dQ f(Q) \int_0^{2r^2(Q-\Phi)/(1+r^2/r_a^2)} dJ^2\left[2(Q-\Phi)-(J^2/r^2)(1+r^2/r_a^2)\right]^{-1/2}$$

or

$$\rho(r) = {4\pi\over 1+r^2/r_a^2} \int_\Phi^0 dQ \sqrt{2(Q-\Phi)}f(Q).$$

This equation has the form of an Abel integral equation and can be inverted to give f in terms of ρ:

$$f(Q) = {\sqrt{2}\over 4\pi^2} {d\over dQ} \int_Q^0 {d\Phi\over\sqrt{\Phi-Q}} {d\rho^'\over d\Phi},\ \ \ \ \ \rho^'(\Phi) = \left[1+r(\Phi)^2/r_a^2\right]\rho\left[r(\Phi)\right].$$

== Properties ==
Following a derivation similar to the one above, the velocity dispersions in an Osipkov–Merritt model satisfy

$${\sigma_r^2\over\sigma_t^2} = 1 + {r^2\over r_a^2}.$$

The motions are nearly radial ($\sigma_r\gg\sigma_t$) for $r\gg r_a$ and nearly isotropic ($\sigma_r\approx\sigma_t$) for $r\ll r_a$. This is a desirable feature, since stellar systems that form via gravitational collapse have isotropic cores and radially-anisotropic envelopes.

If r_{a} is assigned too small a value, f may be negative for some Q. This is a consequence of the fact that spherical mass models can not always be reproduced by purely radial orbits. Since the number of stars on an orbit can not be negative, values of r_{a} that generate negative f's are unphysical. This result can be used to constrain the maximum degree of anisotropy of spherical galaxy models.

In his 1985 paper, Merritt defined two additional families of models ("Type II") that have isotropic cores and tangentially anisotropic envelopes. Both families assume

$$f = f(E-J^2/2r_a^2)$$.

In Type IIa models, the orbits become completely circular at r=r_{a} and remain so at all larger radii. In Type IIb models, stars beyond r_{a} move on orbits of various eccentricities, although the motion is always biased toward circular. In both families, the tangential velocity dispersion undergoes a jump as r increases past r_{a}.

C. M. Carollo et al. (1995) derive many observable properties of Type I Osipkov–Merritt models.

== Applications ==
Typical applications of Osipkov–Merritt models include:

- Modelling of star clusters, galaxies, dark matter halos and galaxy clusters
- Constructing anisotropic galaxy models for studies of dynamical instabilities

== See also ==
- Stellar dynamics
