= GravitySimulator =

gravitySimulator is a novel supercomputer that incorporates special-purpose GRAPE hardware to solve the gravitational n-body problem. It is housed in the Center for Computational Relativity and Gravitation (CCRG) at the Rochester Institute of Technology. It became operational in 2005.

gravitySimulator

The computer consists of 32 nodes, each of which contains a GRAPE-6A board ("mini-GRAPE") in a Peripheral Component Interconnect (PCI) slot. The GRAPE boards use pipelines to compute pairwise forces between particles at a speed of 130 Gflops. The on-board memory of each GRAPE board can hold data for 128,000 particles, and by combining 32 of them in a cluster, a total of four million particles can be integrated, at sustained speeds of 4Tflops.

gravitySimulator is used to study the dynamical evolution of galaxies and galactic nuclei.
