= David Merritt =

American astrophysicist (born 1955)

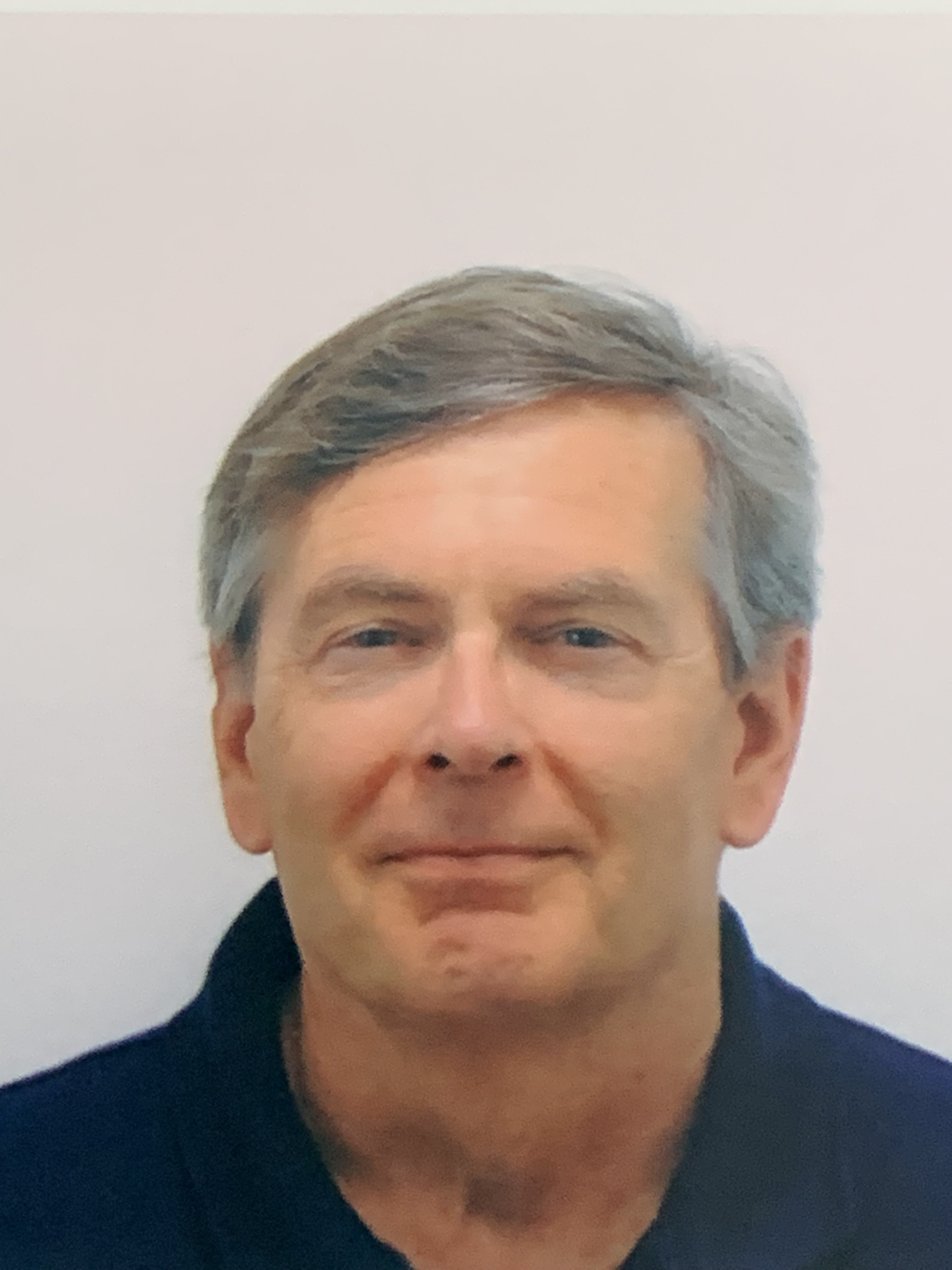
- David Merritt
- Born: November 16, 1955 (age 70)
- Education: Princeton University
- Known for: Leonard–Merritt mass estimator Osipkov–Merritt model M–sigma relation
- Scientific career
- Fields: Astrophysics
- Workplaces: Rochester Institute of Technology; Center for Computational Relativity and Gravitation
- Doctoral advisor: Jeremiah P. Ostriker

David Roy Merritt (born November 16, 1955, in Los Angeles) is an American astrophysicist. He is known for Osipkov–Merritt model, the Leonard–Merritt mass estimator and the M–sigma relation.

== Education and career ==
He received in 1982 his PhD in Astrophysical Sciences from Princeton University with thesis advisor Jeremiah P. Ostriker and held postdoctoral positions at the University of California, Berkeley and the Canadian Institute for Theoretical Astrophysics in Toronto. Merritt's fields of specialization include dynamics and evolution of galaxies, supermassive black holes, and computational astrophysics.

Until 2017, he was a professor at the Rochester Institute of Technology (RIT) in Rochester, New York. He was a former Chair of the Division on Dynamical Astronomy of the American Astronomical Society. He is a founding member of the Center for Computational Relativity and Gravitation at RIT.

His scientific contributions include Osipkov–Merritt models, black hole spin flips, the Leonard–Merritt mass estimator, the M–sigma relation, stellar systems with negative temperatures, and the Schwarzschild barrier.

== Awards and honors ==
- PROSE Award for Excellence in Physical Sciences and Mathematics, for A Philosophical Approach to MOND (2021)
- Garfinkel Lectureship, Yale University (2014)

== Work ==
=== Books ===
- Merritt, D. Dynamics and Evolution of Galactic Nuclei (Princeton: Princeton University Press), 551 pp., 2013
- Merritt, D. A Philosophical Approach to MOND (Cambridge: Cambridge University Press), 282 pp., 2020
- Parusniková, Z. and Merritt, D. (Eds.) Karl Popper's Science and Philosophy (Berlin: Springer International Publishing), 383 pp., 2021

=== Popular articles ===
- Merritt, D. (2023). Touching Reality.
- Merritt, D. (2021). A Non-Standard Model. Aeon, July 2021.
- Ferrarese, L. and Merritt, D. (2002). Supermassive Black Holes. Physics World, June 2002, p. 41.

=== Philosophy of science articles ===
- Merritt, D. (2022). The scientific method from a philosophical perspective. doi/10.5281/zenodo.6336021
- Merritt, D. (2021). Cosmological Realism. Studies in History and Philosophy of Science Part A, 88, p. 193-208.
- Merritt, D. (2021). Feyerabend's Rule and Dark Matter. Synthese, 199, p. 8921–8942.

=== Videos ===
- Schwarzschild Barrier
