= Proper motion =

Measure of observed changes in the apparent locations of stars

Relation between proper motion and velocity components of an object. A year ago the object was d units of distance from the Sun, and its light moved in a year by angle μ radian/s. If there has been no distortion by gravitational lensing or otherwise then μ = $\frac{v_t}{d}$ where $v_t$ is the distance (usually expressed as annual velocity) transverse (tangential or perpendicular) to line of sight from the Sun. The angle is shaded light blue from the Sun to the object's start point and its year later position as if it had no radial velocity. In this diagram the radial velocity happens to be one of the Sun and object parting, so is positive.

Proper motion is the angular speed of an astronomical object, such as a star, as it moves across the sky. It is an astrometric measure, giving an object's change in angular position over time relative to the center of mass of the Solar System. This parameter is measured relative to the distant stars or a stable reference such as the International Celestial Reference Frame (ICRF). Patterns in proper motion reveal larger structures like stellar streams, the general rotation of the Milky Way disk, and the random motions of stars in the Galactic halo.

The components for proper motion in the equatorial coordinate system (of a given epoch, often J2000.0) are given in the direction of right ascension (μ_{α}) and of declination (μ_{δ}). Their combined value is computed as the total proper motion (μ). It has dimensions of angle per time, typically arcseconds per year or milliarcseconds per year.

Knowledge of the proper motion, distance, and radial velocity allows calculations of an object's motion from the Solar System's frame of reference and its motion from the galactic frame of reference – that is motion in respect to the Sun, and by coordinate transformation, that in respect to the Milky Way.

== Introduction ==
The celestial north and south poles are above/below CNP, CSP; the origin of all 24 hours of Right Ascension (the measure of absolute celestial east–west position), the March equinox (center of the sun's position then) at the J2000 epoch, is vector V. In red the diagram adds the components of proper motion across the celestial sphere. An ideal time to measure exactly such a small annual shift is at culmination. The culmination of the star is daily reached when the observer (and Earth) passes as shown by the blue arrows "beneath" the star. The positive axes of the two components of its usually annually measured or published shift in proper motion are the exaggerated red arrows, note: the right arrows point to the east horizon. One red annotation is subtly shorter as the cosine of a star resting at 0° declination is 1, so such a star's east or west shift would not need to be multiplied by the cosine of its declination. The proper motion vector is μ, α = right ascension, δ = declination, θ = position angle.

Over the course of centuries, stars appear to maintain nearly fixed positions with respect to each other, so that they form the same constellations over historical time. As examples, both Ursa Major in the northern sky and Crux in the southern sky, look nearly the same now as they did hundreds of years ago. However, precise long-term observations show that such constellations change shape, albeit very slowly, and that each star has an independent motion.

This motion is caused by the movement of the stars relative to the Sun and Solar System. The Sun travels in a nearly circular orbit (the solar circle) about the center of the galaxy at a speed of about 220 km/s at a radius of 8,000 parsecs (26,000 ly) from Sagittarius A* which can be taken as the rate of rotation of the Milky Way itself at this radius.

Any proper motion is a two-dimensional vector (as it excludes the component as to the direction of the line of sight) typically defined by its position angle and its magnitude. The first is the direction of the proper motion on the celestial sphere (with 0 degrees meaning the motion is north, 90 degrees meaning the motion is east, (left on most sky maps and space telescope images) and so on), and the second is its magnitude, typically expressed in arcseconds per year (symbols: arcsec/yr, as/yr, ″/yr, ″ yr^{−1}) or milliarcseconds per year (symbols: mas/yr, mas yr^{−1}).

Proper motion may alternatively be defined by the angular changes per year in the star's right ascension (μ_{α}) and declination (μ_{δ}) with respect to a defined epoch.

The components of proper motion by convention are arrived at as follows. Suppose an object moves from coordinates (α_{1}, δ_{1}) to coordinates (α_{2}, δ_{2}) in a time Δt. The proper motions are given by:
$$\mu_{\alpha} = \frac{\alpha_2 - \alpha_1}{\Delta t},$$
$$\mu_{\delta}= \frac{\delta_2-\delta_1}{\Delta t} \ .$$
The magnitude of the proper motion μ is given by the Pythagorean theorem:
$$\mu^2 = {\mu_\delta}^2 + {\mu_\alpha}^2 \cdot \cos^2 \delta \ ,$$
technically abbreviated:
$$\mu^2 = {\mu_\delta}^2 + {\mu_{{\alpha \ast}}}^2 \ .$$
where δ is the declination. The factor in cos^{2}δ accounts for the widening of the lines (hours) of right ascension away from the poles, cosδ, being zero for a hypothetical object fixed at a celestial pole in declination. Thus, a co-efficient is given to negate the misleadingly greater east or west velocity (angular change in α) in hours of Right Ascension the further it is towards the imaginary infinite poles, above and below the earth's axis of rotation, in the sky. The change μ_{α}, which must be multiplied by cosδ to become a component of the proper motion, is sometimes called the "proper motion in right ascension", and μ_{δ} the "proper motion in declination".

If the proper motion in right ascension has been converted by cosδ, the result is designated μ_{α*}. For example, the proper motion results in right ascension in the Hipparcos Catalogue (HIP) have already been converted. Hence, the individual proper motions in right ascension and declination are made equivalent for straightforward calculations of various other stellar motions.

The position angle θ is related to these components by:
$$\mu \sin \theta = \mu_\alpha \cos \delta = \mu_{{\alpha \ast}} \ ,$$
$$\mu \cos \theta = \mu_\delta \ .$$

Motions in equatorial coordinates can be converted to motions in galactic coordinates.

== Examples ==
For most stars seen in the sky, the observed proper motions are small and unremarkable. Such stars are often either faint or are significantly distant, have changes of below 0.01″ per year, and do not appear to move appreciably over many millennia. A few do have significant motions, and are usually called high-proper motion stars. Two or more stars which are moving in similar directions, exhibit so-called shared or common proper motion (or cpm.), suggesting they may share similar motion in space (if the distances and radial velocities are also consistent) and thus be gravitationally linked as binary stars or star clusters.

Barnard's Star, showing position every 5 years 1985–2005.

Barnard's Star has the largest proper motion of all stars, moving at 10.3″ yr^{−1}. Large proper motion usually strongly indicates an object is close to the Sun. This is so for Barnard's Star, about 6 light-years away. After the Sun and the Alpha Centauri system, it is the nearest known star. Being a red dwarf with an apparent magnitude of 9.54, it is too faint to see without a telescope or powerful binoculars. Of the stars visible to the naked eye (conservatively limiting unaided visual magnitude to 6.0), 61 Cygni A (magnitude V=5.20) has the highest proper motion at 5.281″ yr^{−1}, discounting Groombridge 1830 (magnitude V=6.42), proper motion: 7.058″ yr^{−1}.

A proper motion of 1 arcsec per year 1 light-year away corresponds to a relative transverse speed of 1.45 km/s. Barnard's Star's transverse speed is 90 km/s and its radial velocity is 111 km/s (perpendicular (at a right, 90° angle), which gives a true or "space" motion of 142 km/s. True or absolute motion is more difficult to measure than the proper motion, because the true transverse velocity involves the product of the proper motion times the distance. As shown by this formula, true velocity measurements depend on distance measurements, which are difficult in general.

In 1992 Rho Aquilae became the first star to have its Bayer designation invalidated by moving to a neighbouring constellation – it is now in Delphinus.

== Usefulness in astronomy ==
Stars with large proper motions tend to be nearby; most stars are far enough away that their proper motions are very small, on the order of a few thousandths of an arcsecond per year. It is possible to construct nearly complete samples of high proper motion stars by comparing photographic sky survey images taken many years apart. The Palomar Sky Survey is one source of such images. In the past, searches for high proper motion objects were undertaken using blink comparators to examine the images by eye. More modern techniques such as image differencing can scan digitized images, or comparisons to star catalogs obtained by satellites. As any selection biases of these surveys are well understood and quantifiable, studies have confirmed more and inferred approximate quantities of unseen stars – revealing and confirming more by studying them further, regardless of brightness, for instance. Studies of this kind show most of the nearest stars are intrinsically faint and angularly small, such as red dwarfs.

Measurement of the proper motions of a large sample of stars in a distant stellar system, like a globular cluster, can be used to compute the cluster's total mass via the Leonard-Merritt mass estimator. Coupled with measurements of the stars' radial velocities, proper motions can be used to compute the distance to the cluster.

Stellar proper motions have been used to infer the presence of a super-massive black hole at the center of the Milky Way. This now confirmed to exist black hole is called Sgr A*, and has a mass of 4.3 × 10^{6} M_{☉} (solar masses).

Proper motions of objects in galaxies in the Local Group can be used to estimate their distance. In 1999, the proper motion of water masers moving very rapidly around the center of NGC 4258 (M106) galaxy was measured via Very Long Baseline Interferometry. In combination with their radial motion this yielded an accurate distance to the galaxy of 7.2±0.5 Mpc. In 2005, the first measurement was made of the proper motion of the Triangulum Galaxy M33, the third largest and only ordinary spiral galaxy in the Local Group, located 0.860 ± 0.028 Mpc beyond the Milky Way. The motion of the Andromeda Galaxy was measured in 2012, and an Andromeda–Milky Way collision is predicted in about 4.5 billion years.

== History ==
Proper motion was suspected by early astronomers (according to Macrobius, c. AD 400) but a proof was not provided until 1718 by Edmond Halley, who noticed that Sirius, Arcturus and Aldebaran were over half a degree away from the positions charted by the ancient Greek astronomer Hipparchus roughly 1850 years earlier.

The lesser meaning of "proper" used is arguably dated English (but neither historic, nor obsolete when used as a postpositive, as in "the city proper") meaning "belonging to" or "own". "Improper motion" would refer to perceived motion that is nothing to do with an object's inherent course, such as due to Earth's axial precession, and minor deviations, nutations well within the 26,000-year cycle.

== See also ==
- Astronomical coordinate systems
- Galaxy rotation curve
- Leonard–Merritt mass estimator
- Milky Way
- Peculiar velocity
- Radial velocity
- Relative velocity
- Solar apex
- Space velocity (astronomy)
- Stellar kinematics
- Very-long-baseline interferometry
