= Center for Computational Relativity and Gravitation =

US research institute

The Center for Computational Relativity and Gravitation (CCRG) is a research center of the College of Science (COS) and a Research Center of Excellence at Rochester Institute of Technology (RIT) dedicated to research at the frontiers of numerical relativity and relativistic astrophysics, gravitational-wave physics, its connection to experiments and observations, and high-performance computation and scientific visualization.

Faculty members currently include Hans-Peter Bischof, Joshua Faber, Manuela Campanelli (Director), Carlos Lousto, David Merritt, John Whelan, Yosef Zlochower and Richard O'Shaughnessy.

Computing facilities in the CCRG include gravitySimulator, a 32-node computer that uses special-purpose GRAPE hardware to achieve speeds of 4Tflops in gravitational N-body calculations; and NewHorizons, a 104-node Linux cluster with dual-processor (dual-core) per node and a total of 1.4 Tbytes of on-board memory.

The mission of the CCRG is "to promote excellence in research and education, and to advance discovery beyond the frontiers of current knowledge in key research areas of computational astrophysics, gravitational physics, high-performance computing and scientific visualization."
