= Leonard–Merritt mass estimator =

Astronomical formula for the mass of a stellar system

In astronomy, the Leonard–Merritt mass estimator is a formula for estimating the mass of a spherical stellar system using the apparent (angular) positions and proper motions of its component stars. The distance to the stellar system must also be known. It is named after Peter Leonard and David Merritt.

Like the virial theorem, the Leonard–Merritt estimator yields correct results regardless of the degree of velocity anisotropy. Its statistical properties are superior to those of the virial theorem. However, it requires that two components of the velocity be known for every star, rather than just one for the virial theorem.

The estimator has the general form
$$\langle M(r)\rangle = {16\over 3\pi G}
\langle R\left(2V_R^2 + V_T^2\right)\rangle.$$

The angle brackets denote averages over the ensemble of observed stars. M(r) is the mass contained within a distance r from the center of the stellar system; R is the projected distance of a star from the apparent center; V_{R} and V_{T} are the components of a star's velocity parallel to, and perpendicular to, the apparent radius vector; and G is the gravitational constant.

Like all estimators based on moments of the Jeans equations, the Leonard–Merritt estimator requires an assumption about the relative distribution of mass and light. As a result, it is most useful when applied to stellar systems that have one of two properties:

1. All or almost all of the mass resides in a central object, or,
2. the mass is distributed in the same way as the observed stars.

Case (1) applies to the nucleus of a galaxy containing a supermassive black hole. Case (2) applies to a stellar system composed entirely of luminous stars (i.e. no dark matter or black holes).

In a cluster with constant mass-to-light ratio and total mass M_{T}, the Leonard–Merritt estimator becomes:
$$M_T = {32\over 3\pi G}
\langle R \left(2V_R^2 + V_T^2\right)\rangle.$$

On the other hand, if all the mass is located in a central point of mass M_{0}, then:
$$M_0 = {16\over 3\pi G}
\langle R\left(2V_R^2 + V_T^2\right)\rangle.$$

In its second form, the Leonard–Merritt estimator has been successfully used to measure the mass of the supermassive black hole at the center of the Milky Way galaxy.

== See also ==
- Globular cluster
- Proper motion
- Virial theorem
