= Gravity Pipe =

GRAPE supercomputer system

Gravity Pipe (abbreviated GRAPE) is a project which uses hardware acceleration to perform gravitational computations. Integrated with Beowulf-style commodity computers, the GRAPE system calculates the force of gravity that a given mass, such as a star, exerts on others. The project resides at University of Tokyo.

The GRAPE hardware acceleration component "pipes" the force computation to the general-purpose computer serving as a node in a parallelized cluster as the innermost loop of the gravitational model.

The GRAPE project designed an ASIC component with mathematical logic and operations to generate the required computations. This means the latter generations of GRAPE supercomputers, despite not providing a Turing complete computational processing power, are powerful for heavily mathematical super-computing usages. The MD-GRAPE 3 supercomputer was also used in protein folding simulations.

Its shortened name, GRAPE, was chosen as an intentional reference to the Apple Inc. line of computers.

== Method ==
The primary calculation in GRAPE hardware is a summation of the forces between a particular star and every other star in the simulation.

Several versions (GRAPE-1, GRAPE-3 and GRAPE-5) use the logarithmic number system (LNS) in the pipeline to calculate the approximate force between two stars and take the antilogarithms of the x, y and z components before adding them to their corresponding total. The GRAPE-2, GRAPE-4 and GRAPE-6 use floating-point arithmetic for more accurate calculation of such forces. The advantage of the logarithmic-arithmetic versions is that they allow more and faster parallel pipes for a given hardware cost because all but the sum portion of the GRAPE algorithm (1.5 power of the sum of the squares of the input data divided by the input data) is easy to perform with LNS.

GRAPE-DR consists of a large number of simple processors, all operating in the SIMD fashion.

== Application ==
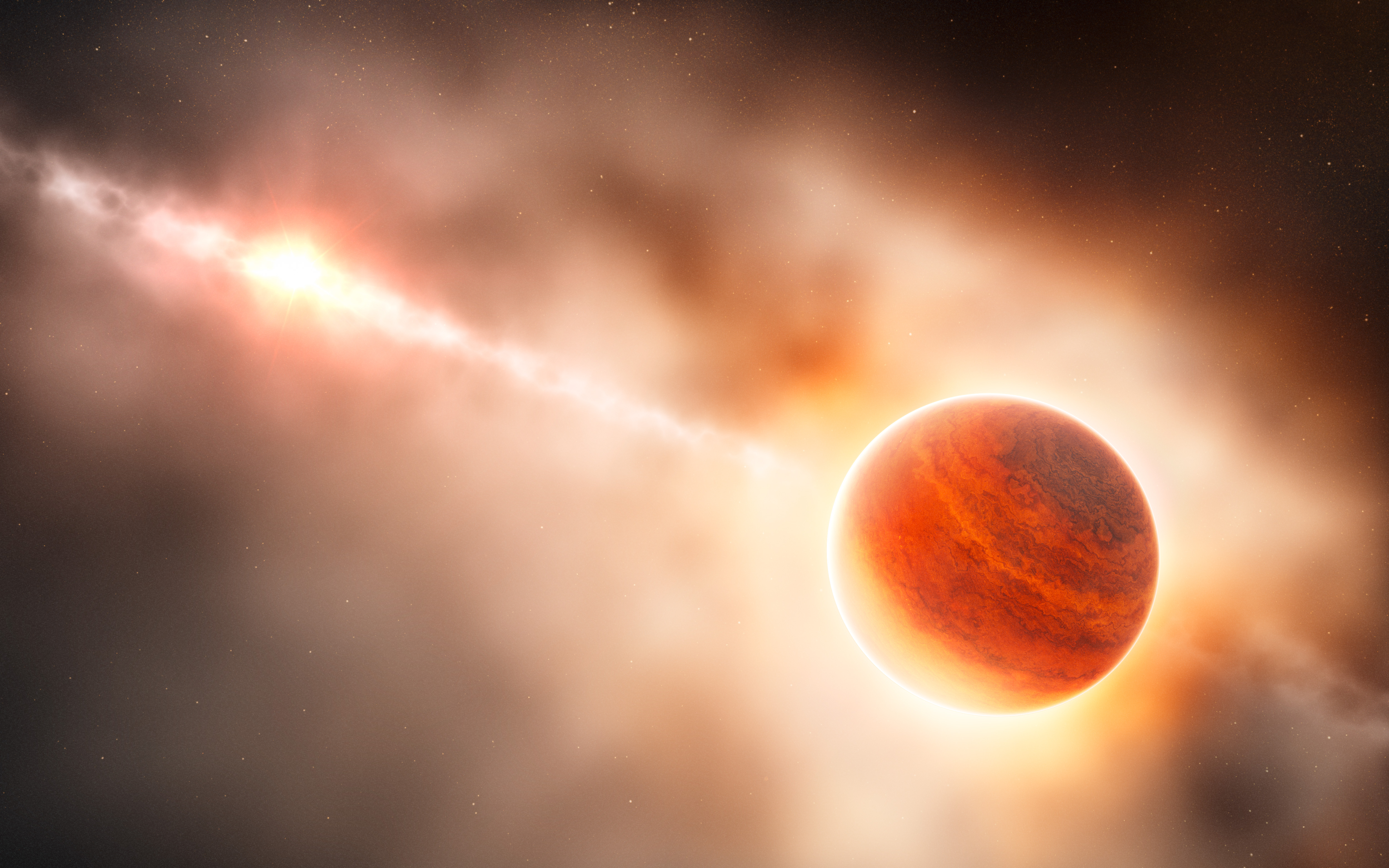
GRAPE has been used in simulations of planetary formation

GRAPE computes approximate solutions to the historically intractable n-body problem, which is of interest in astrophysics and celestial mechanics. n refers to the number of celestial bodies in a given problem. While the 2-body problem was solved by Kepler's laws in the 17th century, any calculation where n > 2 has historically been a nigh-impossible challenge. An analytical solution exists for n = 3, although the resulting series converges too slowly to be of practical use. For n > 2, solutions are generally calculated numerically by determining the interaction between all particles. Thus, the calculation scales as n^{2}.

GRAPE assists in calculations of interactions between particles where the interaction scales as r^{−2}. This dependence is hardwired, drastically improving calculation times. These problems include the evolution of galaxies (gravitation force scales as r^{−2}). Similar problems exist in molecular chemistry and biology, where the force considered would be electrical rather than gravitational.

In 1999, Marseilles Observatory published a study on simulating the formation of proto-planets and plantessimals with a large planetary body. This simulation used the GRAPE-4 system.

== Prizes ==
The LNS-based GRAPE-5 architecture won the Price Performance category of the Gordon Bell Prize in 1999, at about $7 per MegaFLOPS. This category measures the price efficiency of a particular machine in terms of the price in dollars per megaFLOPS. The particular implementation "Grape-6" also won prizes in 2000 and 2001 (see external links). Grape-DR was ranked first in the June 2010 Little Green500 List, a ranking of supercomputer's performance per unit power consumption published by the Green500.org.

== See also ==
- The Gordon Bell Prize, named in honor of Gordon Bell, is administered by the Association for Computing Machinery.
- Supercomputer and High-performance computing are main articles on the general subject.
- gravitySimulator is a cluster containing 32 GRAPEs.
