= Primitive polynomial (field theory) =

Minimal polynomial of a primitive element in a finite field

In field theory, a branch of mathematics, a primitive polynomial is the minimal polynomial of a primitive element of the finite field GF(p^{m}). This means that a polynomial F(X) of degree m with coefficients in GF(p) = Z/pZ is a primitive polynomial if it is monic and has a root α in GF(p^{m}) such that $\{0,1,\alpha, \alpha^2,\alpha^3, \ldots \alpha^{p^m-2}\}$ is the entire field GF(p^{m}). This implies that α is a primitive (p^{m} − 1)-root of unity in GF(p^{m}).

== Properties ==
- Because all minimal polynomials are irreducible, all primitive polynomials are also irreducible.
- A primitive polynomial must have a non-zero constant term, for otherwise it will be divisible by x. Over GF(2), x + 1 is a primitive polynomial and all other primitive polynomials have an odd number of terms, since any polynomial mod 2 with an even number of terms is divisible by x + 1 (it has 1 as a root).
- An irreducible polynomial F(x) of degree m over GF(p), where p is prime, is a primitive polynomial if the smallest positive integer n such that F(x) divides x^{n} − 1 is n = p^{m} − 1.
- A primitive polynomial of degree m has m different roots in GF(p^{m}), which all have order p^{m} − 1, meaning that any of them generates the multiplicative group of the field.
- Over GF(p) there are exactly φ(p^{m} − 1) primitive elements and φ(p^{m} − 1) / m primitive polynomials, each of degree m, where φ is Euler's totient function.
- The algebraic conjugates of a primitive element α in GF(p^{m}) are α, α^{p}, α^{p^{2}}, …, α^{p^{m−1}} and so the primitive polynomial F(x) has explicit form F(x) = (x − α) (x − α^{p}) (x − α^{p^{2}}) … (x − α^{p^{m−1}}). That the coefficients of a polynomial of this form, for any α in GF(p^{n}), not necessarily primitive, lie in GF(p) follows from the property that the polynomial is invariant under application of the Frobenius automorphism to its coefficients (using α^{p^{n}} = α) and from the fact that the fixed field of the Frobenius automorphism is GF(p).

== Examples ==
Over GF(3) the polynomial x^{2} + 1 is irreducible but not primitive because it divides x^{4} − 1: its roots generate a cyclic group of order 4, while the multiplicative group of GF(3^{2}) is a cyclic group of order 8. The polynomial x^{2} + 2x + 2, on the other hand, is primitive. Denote one of its roots by α. Then, because the natural numbers less than and relatively prime to 3^{2} − 1 = 8 are 1, 3, 5, and 7, the four primitive roots in GF(3^{2}) are α, α^{3} = 2α + 1, α^{5} = 2α, and α^{7} = α + 2. The primitive roots α and α^{3} are algebraically conjugate. Indeed x^{2} + 2x + 2 = (x − α) (x − (2α + 1)). The remaining primitive roots α^{5} and α^{7} = (α^{5})^{3} are also algebraically conjugate and produce the second primitive polynomial: x^{2} + x + 2 = (x − 2α) (x − (α + 2)).

For degree 3, GF(3^{3}) has φ(3^{3} − 1) = φ(26) = 12 primitive elements. As each primitive polynomial of degree 3 has three roots, all necessarily primitive, there are 12 / 3 = 4 primitive polynomials of degree 3. One primitive polynomial is x^{3} + 2x + 1. Denoting one of its roots by γ, the algebraically conjugate elements are γ^{3} and γ^{9}. The other primitive polynomials are associated with algebraically conjugate sets built on other primitive elements γ^{r} with r relatively prime to 26:

$$\begin{align}x^3+2x+1 & = (x-\gamma)(x-\gamma^3)(x-\gamma^9)\\
x^3+2x^2+x+1 &= (x-\gamma^5)(x-\gamma^{5\cdot3})(x-\gamma^{5\cdot9}) = (x-\gamma^5)(x-\gamma^{15})(x-\gamma^{19})\\
x^3+x^2+2x+1 &= (x-\gamma^7)(x-\gamma^{7\cdot3})(x-\gamma^{7\cdot9}) = (x-\gamma^7)(x-\gamma^{21})(x-\gamma^{11})\\
x^3+2x^2+1 &= (x-\gamma^{17})(x-\gamma^{17\cdot3})(x-\gamma^{17\cdot9}) = (x-\gamma^{17})(x-\gamma^{25})(x-\gamma^{23}).
\end{align}$$

== Applications ==
=== Field element representation ===
Primitive polynomials can be used to represent the elements of a finite field. If α in GF(p^{m}) is a root of a primitive polynomial F(x), then the nonzero elements of GF(p^{m}) are represented as successive powers of α:

$$\mathrm{GF}(p^m) = \{ 0, 1= \alpha^0, \alpha, \alpha^2, \ldots, \alpha^{p^m-2} \} .$$

This allows an economical representation in a computer of the nonzero elements of the finite field, by representing an element by the corresponding exponent of $\alpha.$ This representation makes multiplication easy, as it corresponds to addition of exponents modulo $p^m-1.$

=== Pseudo-random bit generation ===
Primitive polynomials over GF(2), the field with two elements, can be used for pseudorandom bit generation. In fact, every linear-feedback shift register with maximum cycle length (which is 2^{n} − 1, where n is the length of the linear-feedback shift register) may be built from a primitive polynomial.

In general, for a primitive polynomial of degree m over GF(2), this process will generate 2^{m} − 1 pseudo-random bits before repeating the same sequence.

=== CRC codes ===
The cyclic redundancy check (CRC) is an error-detection code that operates by interpreting the message bitstring as the coefficients of a polynomial over GF(2) and dividing it by a fixed generator polynomial also over GF(2); see Mathematics of CRC. Primitive polynomials, or multiples of them, are sometimes a good choice for generator polynomials because they can reliably detect two bit errors that occur far apart in the message bitstring, up to a distance of 2^{n} − 1 for a degree n primitive polynomial.

== Primitive trinomials ==
A useful class of primitive polynomials is the primitive trinomials, those having only three nonzero terms: x^{r} + x^{k} + 1. Their simplicity makes for particularly small and fast linear-feedback shift registers. A number of results give techniques for locating and testing primitiveness of trinomials.

For polynomials over GF(2), where 2^{r} − 1 is a Mersenne prime, a polynomial of degree r is primitive if and only if it is irreducible. (Given an irreducible polynomial, it is not primitive only if the period of x is a non-trivial factor of 2^{r} − 1. Primes have no non-trivial factors.) Although the Mersenne Twister pseudo-random number generator does not use a trinomial, it does take advantage of this.

Richard Brent has been tabulating primitive trinomials of this form, such as x^{74207281} + x^{30684570} + 1. This can be used to create a pseudo-random number generator of the huge period 2^{74207281} − 1 ≈ 3×10^{22338617}.
