= Primitive element (finite field) =

Generator of the multiplicative group of a finite field

In field theory, a primitive element of a finite field GF(q) is a generator of the multiplicative group of the field. In other words, α ∈ GF(q) is called a primitive element if it is a primitive (q − 1)th root of unity in GF(q); this means that each non-zero element of GF(q) can be written as α^{i} for some natural number i.

If q is a prime number, the elements of GF(q) can be identified with the integers modulo q. In this case, a primitive element is also called a primitive root modulo q.

For example, 2 is a primitive element of the field GF(3) and GF(5), but not of GF(7) since it generates the cyclic subgroup {2, 4, 1} of order 3; however, 3 is a primitive element of GF(7). The minimal polynomial of a primitive element is a primitive polynomial.

== Properties ==
=== Number of primitive elements ===
The number of primitive elements in a finite field GF(q) is φ(q − 1), where φ is Euler's totient function, which counts the number of elements less than or equal to m that are coprime to m. This can be proved by using the theorem that the multiplicative group of a finite field GF(q) is cyclic of order q − 1, and the fact that a finite cyclic group of order m contains φ(m) generators.

== See also ==
- Simple extension
- Primitive element theorem
- Zech's logarithm
