= Comparison of file managers =

The following tables compare general and technical information for a number of notable file managers.

== General information ==
| Name | Developer | Initial release | | Platform | Latest release | | License |
| Name | Developer | Version | Date | Platform | Version | Date | License |
|---|---|---|---|---|---|---|---|
| Altap Salamander | Altap | | 1997-08-15 | Windows | 4.0 | 2019-06-11 | GPL-2.0 |
| Commander One | Eltima Software | | 2015-08-04 | macOS | | | Proprietary |
| Directory Opus | Jonathan Potter; GPSoftware | 1 | 1990-01-03 | AmigaOS | 4.16 | 2001-07-04 | GPL-2.0 |
| Directory Opus | Jonathan Potter; GPSoftware | 1 | 1990-01-03 | AmigaOS | 5.91 | 2015-08-30 | APL |
| Directory Opus | Jonathan Potter; GPSoftware | 1 | 1990-01-03 | AROS | 5.91 | 2015-08-30 | APL |
| Directory Opus | Jonathan Potter; GPSoftware | 1 | 1990-01-03 | MorphOS | 5.91 | 2015-08-30 | APL |
| Directory Opus | Jonathan Potter; GPSoftware | 6 | 2001-06-18 | Windows | 12.27 | 2022-03-21 | Proprietary |
| Dired | Integral part of Emacs. Part of the GNU project. | | ~1976 | | | | GPL-3.0-or-later |
| Dolphin | KDE | 0.5 | 2006-06-07 | BSD | 25.04.0 | 2025-04-10 | GPL-2.0-or-later |
| Dolphin | KDE | 0.5 | 2006-06-07 | Linux | 25.04.0 | 2025-04-10 | GPL-2.0-or-later |
| Dolphin | KDE | 0.5 | 2006-06-07 | macOS | 25.04.0 | 2025-04-10 | GPL-2.0-or-later |
| Dolphin | KDE | 0.5 | 2006-06-07 | Unix | 25.04.0 | 2025-04-10 | GPL-2.0-or-later |
| Dolphin | KDE | 0.5 | 2006-06-07 | Windows | 25.04.0 | 2025-04-10 | GPL-2.0-or-later |
| DOS Navigator | Ritlabs | 0.90 | 1991 | DOS | 1.51 | 1999-04-19 | BSD-3-Clause |
| DOS Navigator | Ritlabs | 0.90 | 1991 | OS/2 | 1.51 | 1999-04-19 | BSD-3-Clause |
| DOS Navigator | Ritlabs | 0.90 | 1991 | Windows | 1.51 | 1999-04-19 | BSD-3-Clause |
| DOS Shell | Microsoft / IBM | | 1988 | DOS | | 1998 | Proprietary |
| Win32 | v3.90 | 2025 | | | | | |
| Win64 | v3.91 | 2025 | | | | | |
| Double Commander | Alexander Koblov (Note: Alexander Koblov also known as alexx2000.) | | 2007 | BSD | | | GPL-2.0-or-later |
| Double Commander | Alexander Koblov | | 2007 | Linux | | | GPL-2.0-or-later |
| Double Commander | Alexander Koblov | | 2007 | macOS | | | GPL-2.0-or-later |
| Double Commander | Alexander Koblov | | 2007 | Unix | | | GPL-2.0-or-later |
| Double Commander | Alexander Koblov | | 2007 | Windows | | | GPL-2.0-or-later |
| emelFM2 | tooar | | 2003-09-06 | BSD | | | GPL-3.0-or-later |
| emelFM2 | tooar | | 2003-09-06 | Linux | | | GPL-3.0-or-later |
| emelFM2 | tooar | | 2003-09-06 | Unix | | | GPL-3.0-or-later |
| Explorer++ | David Ercig | | 2008-01-08 | Windows | 1.4.0 | 2024-01-28 | GPL-3.0-only |
| Far Manager | Eugene Roshal; Far Group | | 1996 | Windows (Linux, Mac, BSD via far2l) | 3.0.6666 | 2026-03-24 | BSD-3-Clause |
| File Explorer (Note: File Explorer previously known as Windows Explorer.) | Microsoft | | 1995-08-24 | Windows | | 2015-07-29 | Proprietary |
| File Manager | Microsoft; Ian Ellison-Taylor | | 1990 | Windows | 10.4.0.0 | 2025-02-22 | MIT |
| Files (Apple) | Apple Inc. | | 2017-09-19 | macOS | | | Proprietary |
| Files by Google | Google LLC | | 2017-12-05 | Android | 1.2263.598736326.1 | 2025-10-28 | Proprietary |
| GeoManager | Berkeley Softworks (Note: Berkeley Softworks later renamed to GeoWorks Corporation.); Breadbox Ensemble (Note: Breadbox Ensemble founded as Breadbox Computer Company.) | | 1990 | GEOS | | 2009 | Proprietary |
| Finder | Apple Inc. | | 1984-01 | macOS | 10.10.5 | 2015-08-13 | Proprietary |
| ForkLift | BinaryNights | | 2007-06-01 | macOS | 4.0.7 | 2024-01-30 | Proprietary |
| gentoo | Emil Brink | | ? | | | | GPL-2.0-only |
| GNOME Commander | GNOME Commander | | 2001-09 | | | | GPL-2.0-or-later |
| GNOME Files (Note: GNOME Files formerly known as Nautilus.) | Eazel | | 2001-04-11 | | 51.0.1 | 2026-09-14 | GPL-3.0-or-later |
| Konqueror | KDE | | 2000-10 | | 26.04.2 | 2026-05-29 | GPL-2.0-or-later |
| Krusader | Krusader Krew | | 2000-07-11 | | R14.1.1 | 2023-10-20 | GPL-2.0-or-later |
| Midnight Commander (Note: Midnight Commander also known as mc.) | Miguel de Icaza; GNU | | 1994-05 (Note: The exact history is unknown. This date comes from changelog entries in the src/TODO file in the Git repository (SHA1: eb6b3842a). But it is probably earlier than that. Dec 1997 was release v4.1 already.) | | 4.8.33 | 2025-01-23 | GPL-3.0-or-later |
| muCommander | Maxence Bernard | | 2002-02-17 | Windows, Linux, macOS | 1.5.2 | 2024-10-18 | GPL-3.0-or-later |
| Nemo | Linux Mint | 1.0.0 | 2012-07 | | 6.6.4 | 2026-02-23 | GPL-2.0-or-later |
| nnn | Arun Prakash Jana | | 2017-04-13 | | 5.3 | 2026-08-15 | BSD-2-Clause |
| Nomad.NET | Eugene Sichkar | 2.2.0.537 beta | 2008-08-14 | | 3.2.0.2890 | 2016-06-13 | Proprietary |
| Norton Commander | Peter Norton Computing; Symantec corporation | | 1986 | DOS | 5.51 | 1998-07-01 | Proprietary |
| Norton Commander | Peter Norton Computing; Symantec corporation | | 1986 | Windows | 2.01 | 1999-02-01 | Proprietary |
| Path Finder (Note: Path Finder originally known as SNAX.) | Cocoatech | | 2001-04 | macOS | 9.1 | 2020-03-24 | Proprietary |
| PathMinder | Albert Nurick; Brittain Fraley | | 1984 | DOS | 4.11 | 1988 | Proprietary |
| PCManFM | Hong Jen Yee | | 2006-01-09 | | 1.3.2 | 2021-02-05 | GPL-2.0-or-later |
| PC Shell | Central Point Software | | 1986 | | | | Proprietary |
| ranger | Roman Zimbelmann | | 2010-06-09 | BSD | 1.9.4 | 2024-11-04 | GPL-3.0-or-later |
| ranger | Roman Zimbelmann | | 2010-06-09 | Linux | 1.9.4 | 2024-11-04 | GPL-3.0-or-later |
| ranger | Roman Zimbelmann | | 2010-06-09 | macOS | 1.9.4 | 2024-11-04 | GPL-3.0-or-later |
| ROX-Filer | Thomas Leonard et al. | | 2000-03-10 | | | | GPL-2.0-or-later |
| Samsung My Files | Samsung Electronics Co., Ltd. | | 2010 | Android | 15.4.02.3 | 2025-01-08 | Proprietary |
| SpaceFM | IgnorantGuru | 0.5.0 | 2012-01-13 | | 1.0.6 | 2018-03-04 | GPL-3.0-or-later |
| STDU Explorer | STDUtility | | 2009-03-23 | Windows | 1.0.465 | 2012-05-24 | Proprietary |
| Tabbles | Yellow blue soft UAB | | 2009-08-01 | Windows | 3.1.29 | 2016-08-12 | Proprietary |
| Thunar | Xfce | | 2006-01-22 | | 4.20.8 | 2026-03-28 | GPL-2.0-or-later |
| Total Commander (Note: Total Commander originally known as Windows Commander.) | Christian Ghisler | 1.0 | 2012-05-18 | Android | 3.62 | 2026-02-16 | Proprietary |
| Total Commander | Christian Ghisler | 1.00d | 1993-09-25 | Windows | 11.58 | 2026-07-01 | Proprietary |
| ViewMAX | Digital Research / Novell | 1.0 | 1990 | DR-DOS | 3.0 | 1993 | GPL-2.0-only (Note: ViewMAX was originally proprietary.) |
| Volkov Commander | Vsevolod Volkov | | 1992 | DOS | 4.05 | 2000-06-16 | Proprietary |
| WinSCP | WinSCP | | 2000-09-30 | Windows | 6.5.8 | 2026-09-09 | GPL-3.0-only |
| Worker | Ralf Hoffmann | 1.0.0 | 1999-03-06 | Unix | 5.4.0 | 2026-03-01 | GPL-2.0-or-later |
| Xandros File Manager | Xandros Corporation | | ? | | 4.2 | 2007-07-26 | Proprietary |
| Xfe | Roland Baudin | | 2002 | | 2.1.6 | 2026-03-28 | GPL |
| Xfm | Simon Marlow; Albert Gräf; Till Straumann; Robert Vogelgesang; Juan D. Martin | | 1992 | | 1.4.3 | 2001-09-03 | GPL-2.0-or-later |
| xplorer² | Nikos Bozinis | | 2004-06-10 | Windows | 5.4.0.2 | 2023-06-14 | Proprietary |
| XTree | Jeffery C. Johnson | | 1985-04-01 | DOS | | 1992 | Proprietary |
| XTree | Jeffery C. Johnson | | 1992 | Windows | | 1992 | Proprietary |
| XYplorer | Donald Lessau | | 1997 | Windows | 28.40.0100 | 2026-09-24 | Proprietary |
| ZTreeWin | Kim Henkel | | 1996 | Windows | 2.4.217 | 2023-11-23 | Proprietary |
| Name | Developer | Initial release | | Platform | Latest release | | License |
| Name | Developer | Version | Date | Platform | Version | Date | License |

== Operating system support ==
=== Cross-platform file managers ===
This table shows the operating systems that the file managers can run on, without emulation.

| File manager | DOS | OS/2 & eCS | Windows | Mac OS X | Linux | BSD | Unix | AmigaOS | OpenVMS |
|---|---|---|---|---|---|---|---|---|---|
| Directory Opus | No | No | Yes | No | No | No | No | Yes | No |
| Dired | Yes | Yes | Yes | Yes | Yes | Yes | Yes | Yes | Yes |
| Dolphin | No | No | Needs KDE | Yes | Yes | Yes | Yes | No | No |
| Double Commander | No | No | Yes | Yes | Yes | Yes | Yes | No | No |
| DOS Navigator | Yes | Yes | Yes | No | No | No | No | No | No |
| emelFM2 | No | No | No | No | Yes | Yes | Yes | No | No |
| GNOME Commander | No | No | No | Yes | Yes | Yes | Yes | No | No |
| Konqueror | No | No | Needs KDE | Yes | Yes | Yes | Yes | No | No |
| Krusader | No | No | No | Needs X | Yes | Yes | Yes | No | No |
| Midnight Commander | Yes | No | Yes | Yes | Yes | Yes | Yes | Yes | No |
| muCommander | No | No | Yes | Yes | Yes | Yes | Yes | ? | Yes |
| nnn | No | No | No | Yes | Yes | Yes | Yes | No | No |
| GNOME Files (Nautilus) | No | No | No | No | Yes | Yes | Yes | No | No |
| Nemo | No | No | No | No | Yes | Yes | Yes | No | No |
| PathMinder | Yes | No | Yes | No | No | No | No | No | No |
| PCManFM | No | Needs POSIX-compliant platform | Needs POSIX-compliant platform | Needs POSIX-compliant platform | Yes | Yes | Yes | No | Yes |
| Ranger | No | No | No | Yes | Yes | Yes | Yes | No | No |
| ROX-Filer | No | No | | | Yes | Yes | Yes | No | No |
| Thunar | No | No | No | No | Yes | Yes | Yes | No | No |
| Total Commander | No | No | Yes | No | No | No | No | No | No |
| Volkov Commander | Yes | Yes | Yes | No | No | No | No | No | No |
| Worker | No | No | No | No | Yes | Yes | Yes | No | No |
| Xandros File Manager | No | No | No | No | Yes | ? | ? | No | No |
| Xfe | No | Needs X | Needs X | Needs X | Yes | Yes | Yes | Needs X | Yes |
| Xfm | No | Needs X | Needs X | Needs X | Yes | Yes | Yes | No | Yes |
| Far Manager | Needs HX DOS Extender | No | Yes | Yes (far2l) | Yes (far2l) | Yes (far2l) | ? | No | No |
| ZTreeWin | No | Yes | Yes | No | No | No | No | No | No |
| File manager | DOS | OS/2 & eCS | Windows | Mac OS X | Linux | BSD | Unix | AmigaOS | OpenVMS |

=== Mac-only file managers ===
- Finder
- ForkLift
- Path Finder
- Commander One

=== *nix-only file managers ===
- Demos Commander
- emelFM2
- Gentoo file manager
- Konqueror
- Krusader
- nnn
- Nautilus
- Nemo
- PCMan File Manager
- Ranger
- ROX-Filer
- Thunar
- SpaceFM
- Worker

=== Windows-only file managers ===
- Altap Salamander
- Directory Opus
- Explorer++
- File Manager (Windows)
- Nomad.NET
- STDU Explorer
- Total Commander
- File Explorer
- xplorer²
- XYplorer
- ZTreeWin

=== iOS-only file managers ===
- Files (Apple)

=== Android-only file managers ===
- Files by Google
- Ghost Commander

== Manager views ==
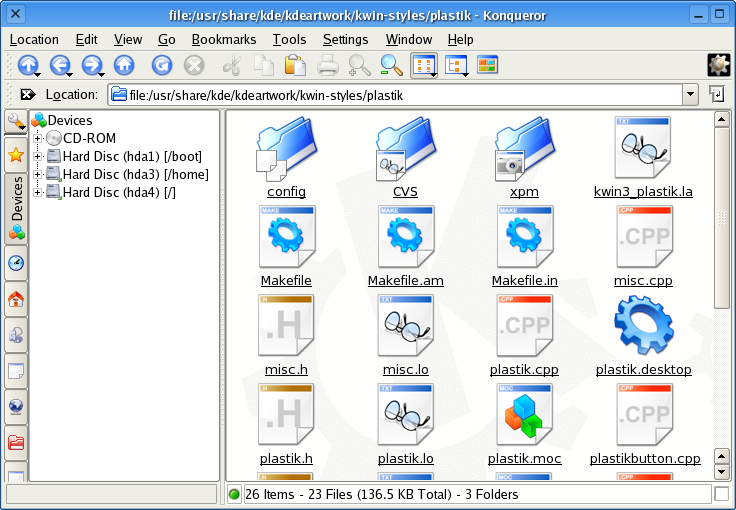
Icon views represent files and folders as large icons.

Details + thumbnails views and favs-panel (bottom left)

Information about what common file manager views are implemented natively (without third-party add-ons).

Note that the "Column View" does not refer to the Miller Columns browsing / visualization technique that can be applied to tree structures / folders.

| File manager | Family | UI | Icon view | List view | Column view | Thumbnails | Details + Thumbs | Grouping | Content dependent (Note: Content Dependent (System) refers to a system which attempts to detect the dominant type of files in that folder and then select the most appropriate view mode for you automatically.) | Twin panel | Favorites / Bookmark | Panel tabs |
|---|---|---|---|---|---|---|---|---|---|---|---|---|
| Altap Salamander | Orthodox | GUI | Yes | Yes | Yes | Yes | No | No | No | Yes | Partial | No |
| Commander One | Orthodox | GUI | Yes | Yes | Yes | Yes | ? | ? | No | ? | Yes | Yes |
| Demos Commander | Orthodox | Text | ? | Yes | ? | ? | ? | ? | ? | Yes | ? | ? |
| Directory Opus | Orthodox | GUI | Yes | Yes | Yes | Yes | Yes | Yes | Yes | Yes | Yes | Yes |
| Dired | Directory editor | Text | Yes, on GUI | Yes | ? | Yes, on GUI | Yes, on GUI | Yes | Yes | Yes, one or more | Partial (bookmarks) | Yes (optional tab bar) |
| Dolphin | Navigational | GUI | Yes | Yes | Yes | Yes | Yes | Yes | No | Yes | Yes | Yes |
| Double Commander | Orthodox | GUI | Yes | Yes | Yes | Yes | Yes | Yes | Yes | Yes | Yes | Yes |
| DOS Navigator | Orthodox | Text | ? | Yes | ? | ? | ? | ? | ? | Yes | ? | ? |
| emelFM2 | Orthodox | GUI | No | Yes | No | Yes (Note: Optional image thumbnailer plugin since v0.3.4 (24/5/2007)) | ? | No | No | Yes | ? | No |
| FAR Manager | Orthodox | Text (Note: The text interface, which can be partially graphical with some plugins, such as embedded image/video viewers, for example. But the text interface is only emulated with the ConEmu mod - it is graphical and TrueColor in reality.) | Partial (Note: With the ConEmu mod or plugins.) | Yes | Yes | Yes | Partial | Yes | Yes | Yes | Yes | Partial (Note: Via multi-panel plugins or the ConEmu mod.) |
| File Manager (Windows) | Orthodox | GUI | Yes | Yes | No | ? | ? | ? | ? | Yes | No | No |
| Files (Apple) | | GUI | Yes | | | Yes | Yes | | | | | |
| Files by Google | | GUI | | | | | | | | | | |
| Finder | Spatial / Miller Columns | GUI | Yes | Yes | Yes | Yes | Yes, with Cover Flow | Yes | No | No | Yes | Yes |
| ForkLift | Orthodox | GUI | Yes | Yes | Yes | Yes | Partial | Yes | No | Yes | Yes | Yes |
| gentoo | Orthodox | GUI | ? | Yes | ? | ? | ? | ? | ? | Yes | ? | ? |
| GNOME Commander | Orthodox | GUI | No | Yes | No | No | ? | No | No | Yes | ? | Yes |
| Konqueror | Navigational / Orthodox | GUI | Yes | Yes | Yes | Yes | Yes | Yes | Yes | Yes | Yes | Yes |
| Krusader | Orthodox | GUI | Yes | Yes | Yes | Yes | ? | No | Yes | Yes | Yes | Yes |
| Midnight Commander | Orthodox | Text | No | Yes | Yes | ? | ? | ? | Yes | Yes | Yes | ? |
| GNOME Files (Nautilus) | Navigational / Spatial | GUI | Yes | No | Yes | Yes | Yes | No | No | No | Yes | Yes |
| Nemo | Navigational / Spatial | GUI | Yes | Yes | Yes | Yes | Yes | No | No | Yes,press[F3] | Yes | Yes |
| Nomad.NET | Orthodox | GUI | Yes | Yes | Yes | Yes | ? | Yes | Partial, Manual | Yes | Yes | Yes, Shared |
| Path Finder | Navigational | GUI | Yes | Yes | Yes | Yes | No | Yes | No | Yes | Yes | Yes |
| PCManFM | Navigational | GUI | Yes | Yes | Yes | Yes | Yes | ? | No | Yes | Yes | Yes |
| ROX-Filer | Spatial | GUI | Yes | Yes | No | Yes | Yes | No | No | No | Yes | No |
| STDU Explorer | Navigational | GUI | Yes | Yes | Yes | Yes | No | No | No | No | No | No |
| Total Commander | Orthodox | GUI | Yes | Yes | Yes | Yes | Yes | Yes | Yes In viewing | Yes | Yes | Yes |
| Thunar | Navigational | GUI | Yes | Yes | Yes | Yes | Yes | Yes | No | Yes | Yes | Yes |
| Volkov Commander | Orthodox | Text | ? | Yes | ? | ? | ? | ? | ? | Yes | ? | ? |
| Windows Explorer | Navigational / Spatial | GUI | Yes | Yes | Yes (Note: Column view is called Details view in Windows Explorer) | Yes | Partial (Note: Windows 7 introduces a Content view which shows details as well as thumbnails) | Yes | Yes | No | Yes | No |
| Worker | Orthodox | GUI | No | Yes | No | No | No | No | No | Yes | Yes | Yes |
| Xandros File Manager | Navigational | GUI | Yes | ? | ? | ? | ? | ? | ? | ? | ? | ? |
| Xfe | Hybrid Navigational | GUI | Yes | Yes | Yes | Yes | Yes | No | No | Yes | Yes | No |
| Xfm | Spatial | GUI | Yes | No | No | No | No | ? | ? | No | ? | No |
| xplorer² | Hybrid Navigational / Orthodox | GUI | Yes | Yes | Yes | Yes | Yes (Note: Via "Mirrored Browsing" feature.) | Yes | Yes | Yes | Yes | Yes |
| XYplorer | Hybrid Navigational / Orthodox | GUI | Yes | Yes | Yes | Yes | Yes | No | No | Yes | Yes | Yes |
| ZTreeWin | Orthodox | Text | No | Yes | Yes | No | Partial | Yes | No | Yes | Yes | No |
| File manager | Family | UI | Icon view | List view | Column view | Thumbnails | Details + Thumbs | Grouping | Content dependent | Twin panel | Favorites / Bookmark | Panel tabs |

Twin-panel file managers have obligatory connected panels where action in one panel results in reaction in the second. Konqueror supports multiple panels divided horizontally, vertically or both, but these panels do not act as twin panels by default (the user has to mark the panels he wants to act as twin-panels).

== Network protocols ==
Information on what networking protocols the file managers support. Note that many of these protocols might be supported, in part or in whole, by software layers below the file manager, rather than by the file manager itself; for example, the macOS Finder doesn't implement those protocols, and the Windows Explorer doesn't implement most of them, they just make ordinary file system calls to access remote files, and Konqueror either uses ordinary file system calls or KIO slave calls to access remote files. Some functions, such as browsing for servers or shares, might be implemented in the file manager even if most functions are implemented below the file manager.

| File manager | SMB/CIFS | WebDAV | NFS | AFP | FTP | FISH/SSH |
|---|---|---|---|---|---|---|
| Altap Salamander | Yes | No | Yes | No | Yes | Yes |
| Commander One | Yes (Note: Support is provided by the underlying operating system.) | Yes | Yes | Yes | Yes | Yes |
| Directory Opus | Yes | Yes | Yes | No | Yes | Yes (SFTP & SSL (Note: Requires an additional licence (purchased separately))) |
| Dired | Yes | Yes | Yes | No | Yes | Yes |
| Dolphin | Yes | Yes | Yes | ? | Yes | Yes |
| Double Commander | Yes | ? | ? | ? | Yes | ? |
| emelFM2 | ? | ? | ? | ? | No | ? |
| Far Manager | Yes | Partial (Note: WebDAV support in these file managers requires the installation of NetDrive or WebDrive.) | Partial (Note: NFS support in these file managers requires the installation of Services for UNIX.) | No | Yes | Yes (Note: Support is provided via a free third-party plugin.) |
| File Manager | ? | ? | ? | ? | ? | ? |
| Files (Apple) | | | | | | |
| Files by Google | | | | | | |
| Finder | Yes | Yes | Yes | Yes | Partial | No |
| ForkLift | Yes | Yes | Yes | Yes | Yes | Yes |
| GNOME Commander | Yes | Yes | Yes | No | Yes | Yes |
| Konqueror | Yes | Yes | Yes | Yes | Yes | Yes |
| Krusader | Yes | Yes | Yes | No | Yes | Yes |
| muCommander | Yes | ? | Yes | ? | Yes | Yes |
| Midnight Commander | Yes (Note: From version 4.8.28 support for Samba will be removed. "Coming soon: 4.8.28; what's new".) | No | Yes | No | Yes | Yes |
| GNOME Files (Nautilus) | Yes | Yes | Yes | Yes | Yes | Yes |
| Nemo | Yes | ? | ? | ? | Yes | Yes |
| Nomad.NET | Yes | No | No | No | Yes | No |
| Path Finder | Yes | Yes | Yes | Yes | Yes (Read Access) | No |
| PCManFM | Yes (Note: Support is provided by GVfs) | ? | ? | ? | ? | ? |
| ROX-Filer | Yes | Yes | Yes | Yes | Yes | Yes |
| Total Commander | Yes | Yes | Partial | No | Yes | Yes |
| Thunar | Yes | Yes | Yes | No | Yes | Yes |
| Worker | ? | ? | ? | ? | Yes (Note: Support is provided by AVfs) | ? |
| Windows Explorer | Yes | Yes | Yes (Note: NFS support requires either the freely downloadable Windows Services for UNIX or is built-in starting with Windows Vista Enterprise and Ultimate editions as Subsystem for Unix-based applications (SUA).) | No | Yes | No |
| Xandros File Manager | ? | ? | ? | ? | ? | ? |
| Xfe | ? | ? | ? | ? | ? | ? |
| Xfm | ? | ? | ? | ? | ? | ? |
| xplorer² | Yes | Yes (Note: WebDAV is supported via Microsoft Windows' built-in Network Places/Mapped Drive functionality.) | Partial | No | Yes | No |
| XYplorer | Yes | Yes | Yes | No | Yes | No |
| ZTreeWin | Yes | Partial (Note: FTP support in these file managers requires the installation of NetDrive or WebDrive.) | Partial | No | Partial | Partial (Note: SSH support in these file managers requires the installation of SftpDrive or WebDrive.) |
| File manager | SMB/CIFS | WebDAV | NFS | AFP | FTP | FISH/SSH |

== File features ==
Information on what basic file features the file managers support.

| File Manager | Undo/redo file operation | File compression | File encryption | Rename busy files | File preview | File coloring filter | File selection filter | Paste clipboard as file | File and folder reports | ACL (Access control list) | Mass rename | Run executable files |
|---|---|---|---|---|---|---|---|---|---|---|---|---|
| Altap Salamander | ? | Yes | Yes | ? | Yes | Yes | Yes, multiple | ? | Yes | Yes | Yes | Yes |
| Commander One | ? | Yes | Yes | Yes | Yes | Yes | Yes | ? | No | ? | ? | ? |
| Directory Opus | Yes | Yes | Partial | Partial | Yes | Yes | Yes | Yes | Yes | ? | Yes | ? |
| Dired | Partial | Yes | Yes | Yes | Yes | Yes | Yes | Yes | ? | Yes | Yes | Yes |
| Dolphin | Yes | Yes | Yes | Yes | Yes | ? | ? | Yes | ? | Yes | Yes | Yes |
| Double Commander | No | Yes | Yes | Yes | Yes | Yes | Yes | Yes | Yes | ? | Yes | ? |
| emelFM2 | ? | Yes | Yes | Yes | No | ? | Yes | No | ? | Yes | ? | ? |
| FAR Manager | ? | Yes | Yes | Yes | Yes | Yes | Yes | Partial | Yes | Plugin | Plugin | ? |
| File Manager | ? | Yes | ? | ? | No | Yes | Yes | No | ? | Yes | Yes | Yes |
| Files (Apple) | | Yes | | | Yes | | | | | | | |
| Files by Google | | | | | | | | | | | | |
| Finder | Yes | Yes | Yes | Yes | Yes | Yes | ? | No | ? | Yes | Yes | Yes |
| ForkLift | Yes | Yes | No | No | Yes | Yes | Yes | No | No | Yes | Yes | ? |
| GNOME Commander | ? | Yes | ? | ? | Yes | Yes | ? | ? | ? | No | Yes | ? |
| Konqueror | Partial | Yes | Yes | Yes | Yes | Yes | Yes | Yes | Yes | Yes | Yes | Yes |
| Krusader | ? | Yes | Yes | Yes | Yes | No | Yes | Yes | ? | Yes | Yes | Yes |
| Midnight Commander | ? | Yes | ? | ? | ? | Yes | Yes | Partial | ? | ? | Yes | Yes |
| GNOME Files (Nautilus) | Yes | Yes | No | Yes | Yes | No | No | Partial | No | Yes | No | No |
| Nemo | Yes | Yes | Yes | ? | Yes | Yes | ? | Yes | ? | ? | No | Yes |
| Nomad.NET | ? | Yes | Yes | Yes | Yes | Yes | Yes | Yes | Yes | Yes | Partial | ? |
| Path Finder | ? | Yes | No | No | Yes | No | Yes | No | Yes | No | No | ? |
| PCManFM | No | Yes | ? | Yes | No | ? | ? | ? | ? | ? | ? | Yes |
| ROX-Filer | ? | With helper applications | | Yes | Yes | No | Yes | No | No | No | Yes | ? |
| STDU Explorer | ? | No | No | No | Yes | No | No | No | No | No | No | ? |
| Thunar | Yes | Yes (via plugin) | Yes (via plugin) | ? | Yes | Yes | Yes | Yes | Yes | Yes | Yes | Yes |
| Total Commander | ? | Yes | Yes | Yes | Yes | Yes | Yes | Yes | Yes | Log file | Yes | Yes |
| Windows Explorer | Yes | Yes | Partial | No | Yes | No | No | Partial | No | Yes | Partial | Yes |
| Worker | ? | Yes | Yes | ? | Yes | Yes | Yes | No | ? | Yes | ? | Yes |
| Xandros File Manager | ? | ? | ? | ? | ? | ? | ? | ? | ? | ? | ? | ? |
| Xfe | Yes | Yes | No | Yes | No | ? | Yes | No | ? | Yes | No | ? |
| Xfm | ? | ? | ? | ? | ? | ? | ? | ? | ? | ? | ? | ? |
| xplorer² | No | Yes | Partial | Partial | Yes | Yes | Yes | Yes | Yes | Yes | Yes | Yes |
| XYplorer | Yes | Yes | Partial | Yes | Yes | Yes | Yes | Yes | Yes | Yes | Yes | ? |
| ZTreeWin | ? | Yes | Partial | Yes | Yes | Yes | Yes | No | Yes | No | Yes | ? |
| File Manager | Undo/redo file operation | File compression | File encryption | Rename busy files | File preview | File coloring filter | File selection filter | Paste clipboard as file | File and folder reports | ACL (Access control list) | Mass rename | Run executable files |

== Browsing features ==
| File manager | Symbolic links | Windows long path support | Browse compressed folders | Slideshows | Shows combined size of selected directories | Branch sizes | Directory compare | Synchronizer | Find as you type (Type-ahead find) | Embedded/integrated terminal | For directories, size column shows: |
|---|---|---|---|---|---|---|---|---|---|---|---|
| Altap Salamander | ? | ? | Yes | No | Yes | ? | Yes | Partial (for remote folders) | Yes | Yes | DIR |
| Commander One | Yes | ? | Yes | No | Yes | ? | No | No | Yes | Yes, in the PRO Pack | DIR and total size including subdirectories |
| Directory Opus | Yes | Yes | Yes | ? | Yes | Yes | Yes | Yes | Yes | Yes | DIR and total size including subdirectories |
| Dired | Yes | ? | Yes | Yes | No | ? | Yes | Yes | Yes | Yes | Literal (Note: Literal - meaning the size of the directory file itself, not the number or sizes of the files it points to (commonly called its "contents"). Typically a few kilobytes.) |
| DOS Navigator | No | ? | Yes | No | Yes | ? | Yes | ? | Yes | Yes | Total size including subdirectories |
| Dolphin | Yes | ? | Yes | No | Yes | No | No | No | Yes | Yes | Number of entries |
| Double Commander | Yes | Yes | Yes | No | Yes | Yes | Yes | Yes | Yes | Yes | DIR |
| emelFM2 | ? | ? | ? | No | Yes | ? | Yes | ? | Yes | Yes | Literal |
| FAR Manager | Yes | ? | Yes | Partial (Note: Support is provided via a free third-party plugin.) | Yes | Yes | Yes | Partial | Yes | Yes | ? |
| Files (Apple) | | ? | | | | | | | | | |
| Files by Google | | ? | | | | | | | | | |
| Finder | ? | ? | No | Yes | Yes | ? | No | No | Yes | No | Yes |
| ForkLift | Yes | ? | Yes | Yes | Yes | ? | Yes | Yes | Yes | Yes | DIR and total size including subdirectories |
| GNOME Commander | ? | ? | No | No | Yes | Yes | Yes | Yes | Yes | Yes | ? |
| Konqueror | Yes | ? | Yes | Yes | Yes (with konq-plugin) | Yes | Yes (with kdiff3 plugin) | Yes (with kdiff3 plugin) | Yes | Yes | Folder only size (default) selectable to file count/total size |
| Krusader | ? | ? | Yes | No | Yes | Yes | Yes | Yes | Yes | Yes | ? |
| Midnight Commander | Yes | ? | Yes | ? | Yes | ? | Yes | Yes | Yes | Yes | ? |
| muCommander | No | ? | ? | ? | ? | ? | ? | Yes | ? | Partial, command execution only | ? |
| GNOME Files (Nautilus) | ? | ? | No | No | Yes | No | No | No | Yes | Yes, With Plugin | Number of entries |
| Nemo | ? | ? | ? | ? | ? | ? | ? | ? | ? | Yes, with nemo-terminal extension | |
| Nomad.NET | Yes | ? | Yes | No | Yes | Yes | Yes | No | Yes | Yes, via Plugin | DIR and total size including subdirectories |
| Path Finder | ? | ? | No | Yes | Partial | ? | No | No | Yes | Yes | Yes |
| PCManFM | ? | ? | Yes | No | Yes | Yes | No | ? | Yes | No, but there is a fork attempt | Nothing |
| ROX-Filer | ? | ? | No | No | Yes | ? | No | ? | Yes, and browsing with tab completion | No | Nothing |
| Thunar | Yes | ? | No | No | Yes | ? | No | No | Yes | No | Configurable |
| Total Commander | Yes | ? | Yes | Yes In plugin | Yes | Yes | Yes | Yes | Yes | Yes | DIR and total size including subdirectories |
| Windows Explorer | Partial | Partial | Yes | Yes | Yes (in folder tooltips) | Partial | No | Yes | Yes | No | ? |
| Worker | Yes | ? | Yes | No | Yes | ? | Yes | ? | ? | No | |
| Xandros File Manager | ? | ? | ? | ? | ? | ? | ? | ? | ? | No | ? |
| Xfe | Yes | ? | No | No | Yes | ? | Yes | ? | No | No | ? |
| Xfm | ? | ? | ? | ? | ? | ? | ? | ? | ? | No | ? |
| xplorer² | Yes | Yes | Yes | No | Yes | Yes | Yes | Yes | Yes | Yes | ? |
| XYplorer | Yes | Yes | Yes | Yes | Yes | Yes | Yes | Partial | Yes | Yes | Contents including subs |
| ZTreeWin | ? | ? | Yes | No | Yes | Yes | Yes | No | Yes | ? | Selectable: number of entries or size (optional: including subs) |
| File manager | Symbolic links | Windows long path support | Browse compressed folders | Slideshows | Shows combined size of selected directories | Branch sizes | Directory compare | Synchronizer | Find as you type (Type-ahead find) | Embedded/integrated terminal | For directories, size column shows: |

== Search features ==
Information on what file searching features the file managers support. RegExp include the possibilities of nested Boolean searches, thus implicitly all file managers supporting RegExp search support also Boolean searches.

| File manager | File name (Note: using wildcards, subfolders) | File contents (Note: using wildcards, case match, whole word match) | Basic metadata search (Note: size, date, time, attributes (read only, hidden, archivable, etc.) | All metadata search (Note: what/where is additional metadata?) | RegExp for contents | Boolean (nesting levels) | Fuzzy logic (Note: what is fuzzy logic and how is it useful?) | Save searches (Note: Ability to save templates containing all search settings (file filter, metadata requirements etc.). Results of saves searches are always live, so not the results but the search conditions are saved.) | Refined searches (Note: Also known as iterative searches. For example the ability to finish one search and then perform a new search a) only within these results (intersect the two result sets / the requirements of both searches have to be met), 2) adding to these results (combine both result sets to a bigger set) or 3) subtract from those results (original result set reduced by intersection of result sets).) |
|---|---|---|---|---|---|---|---|---|---|
| Altap Salamander | Yes | ? | Yes | ? | Yes (Note: Altap Salamander Search offers RegExp for defining the file content.) | Yes | ? | Yes | Yes |
| Commander One | Yes | Yes | Yes (Note: Support is provided by the underlying operating system.) | Yes | Yes | Yes | ? | No | No |
| Directory Opus | Yes | Yes | Yes | Yes | Yes | Yes | Yes | Yes | Yes |
| Dired | Yes | Yes | Yes | Yes | Yes | Yes | Yes | Yes | Yes |
| Dolphin | Yes | ? | Yes | Yes | Yes | Yes | ? | ? | Yes |
| Double Commander | Yes | Yes | Yes | Yes | Yes | Yes | ? | Yes | No |
| emelFM2 | Yes | ? | Yes | Yes | ? | ? | ? | Partial | ? |
| FAR Manager | Yes | ? | Yes | Yes | Yes (Note: Support is provided via a free third-party plugin.) | Yes | Yes | Yes | Yes |
| Files (Apple) | | | | | | | | | |
| Files by Google | | | | | | | | | |
| Finder | Yes | ? | Yes | Yes | No | ? | ? | Yes | ? |
| ForkLift | Yes | Partial | Yes | Yes | Yes | Yes | ? | No | No |
| Konqueror | Yes | Yes | Yes | Yes | Yes | Yes | No | Yes | Yes |
| Krusader | Yes | ? | Yes | Yes | Yes | No | No | Yes | Yes |
| GNOME Files (Nautilus) | Yes | ? | Partial (Note: Can integrate with Beagle to provide more searching functionality.) | Partial | ? | ? | ? | Yes | ? |
| Nemo | Yes | ? | ? | ? | ? | ? | ? | ? | ? |
| Nomad.NET | Yes | Yes | Yes | Yes | Yes | Yes | No | Yes | Yes |
| Path Finder | Yes | ? | Yes | Yes | No | No | ? | No | No |
| PCManFM | Yes | ? | Yes | No | Yes | No | No | No | No |
| ROX-Filer | Yes | ? | Yes | Yes | Yes | Yes | ? | No | ? |
| Total Commander | Yes | Yes | Yes | Yes | Yes | Yes | No | Yes | Partial (Note: Search intersection) |
| Windows Explorer | Yes | No | Yes | No | No | ? | ? | Yes | Yes |
| Worker | Yes | Yes | Yes | ? | Yes | ? | ? | ? | ? |
| Xandros File Manager | ? | ? | ? | ? | ? | ? | ? | ? | ? |
| Xfe | Yes | Yes (Note: One can search for file contents using the Text Contains field in the search window.) | Yes | No | No | No | No | No | No |
| Xfm | ? | ? | ? | ? | ? | ? | ? | ? | ? |
| xplorer² | Yes | Yes | Yes | Yes | Yes | Yes | Yes | Yes | Yes |
| XYplorer | Yes | Yes | Yes | Yes | Yes | Yes | Yes | Yes | Yes (Note: After searching results, user can apply advanced visual filters to narrow down results.) |
| ZTreeWin | Yes | Yes | Yes | Partial | Partial (Note: ZTreeWin provides several context specific search syntaxes that are not pure regex) | Yes | Yes | Yes | Yes |
| File manager | File name | File contents | Basic metadata search | All metadata search | RegExp for contents | Boolean (nesting levels) | Fuzzy logic | Save searches | Refined searches |

Column Definitions (D)

Entry Notes (s)

== Extensibility ==
Information on which parts of the application can be extended by plugins.

| File manager | Filesystem support | Attribute columns | File previews | Metadata indexing | Unicode support | Visual themes |
|---|---|---|---|---|---|---|
| Altap Salamander | Yes | Yes | Yes | ? | Partial | No |
| Commander One | Yes | Yes | Yes | ? | Yes | Yes |
| Directory Opus | Yes | Yes | Yes | Partial | Yes | Yes |
| Dired | Yes | Yes | Yes | Yes | Yes | Yes |
| Dolphin | Yes | No | Yes | Yes | Yes | Yes |
| Double Commander | Yes | Yes | Yes | No | Yes | Partial (Note: User can change toolbar icons) |
| emelFM2 | ? | ? | ? | ? | | ? |
| Far Manager | Yes | Yes | Yes | Partial | Yes (Note: In Far 2.0 & Far 3.0+) | No |
| Files (Apple) | | | Yes | | Yes | |
| Files by Google | | | | | | |
| Finder | Yes | No | Yes | Yes | Yes (Note: Unicode support depends on Mac OS version. Mac OS X's Finder includes full Unicode support, while Mac OS 8 and earlier does not. May be supported in >=8.1 and <=9.2 if using Unicode filesystems.) | Partial (Note: File and folder icons customizable on OS level and via folder properties) |
| ForkLift | Yes | Yes | Yes | No | Yes | Yes |
| Konqueror | Yes | No | Yes | Yes | Yes | Yes |
| Krusader | Yes | No | Yes | Partial | | Yes |
| Midnight Commander | Yes | No | No | No | Yes | No |
| GNOME Files (Nautilus) | Yes | ? | Yes | ? | Yes | Yes |
| Nemo | Yes | ? | Yes | Yes | Yes | Yes |
| Nomad.NET | Yes | Yes | Yes | ? | Yes | Yes |
| Path Finder | ? | ? | ? | ? | | ? |
| PCManFM | Yes | Yes | Yes | No | Yes | No |
| ROX-Filer | | No | Yes | No | | ? |
| Total Commander | Yes | Yes | Yes | Yes In search tool | Yes (Note: Main change in Total Commander 7.50) | Yes (Note: User can manually change icon themes including toolbar, file and folder icons. User can also change the color scheme to a pre-defined one or manually pick a color for each element in preferences.) |
| Windows Explorer | Yes | Yes | Yes | Yes | Yes | Partial |
| Worker | Yes | No | Yes | No | Yes | ? |
| Xandros File Manager | ? | ? | ? | ? | ? | ? |
| Xfe | No | Partial | No | No | Partial | Partial (Note: User can change icon themes in preferences, which change the toolbar, file and folder icons. User can also change the color scheme to a pre-defined one or manually pick a color for each element (in preferences).) |
| Xfm | ? | ? | ? | ? | ? | ? |
| xplorer² | Yes | Yes | Yes | ? | Yes | Yes |
| XYplorer | Yes | Yes | Yes | ? | Yes | Yes |
| ZTreeWin | Yes | Yes | Yes | ? | Yes | No |
| File manager | Filesystem support | Attribute columns | File previews | Metadata indexing | Unicode support | Visual themes |
