= Path Finder =

File browser

- Path Finder's current logo
- Developer: Cocoatech
- Operating system: macOS
- Type: File browser
- License: Shareware
- Website: cocoatech.io

Path Finder (originally SNAX) is a Macintosh file browser developed by Cocoatech. First released in 2001 simultaneously with the public release of Mac OS X 10.0 (Cheetah), it replicates or integrates most of the features of the Finder, but introduces additional functionality similar to that found in the Windows File Explorer, the defunct Norton Commander, and other third-party file browsers developed for a variety of platforms.

== Features ==
Primarily a navigational file manager, Path Finder also features support for configuration as a correct orthodox or spatial file manager. Most operations can take place in a single window, although more windows or tabs can be opened. The interface can further be customized by enabling or disabling various panels and/or their corresponding functionality.

Some of Path Finder's features not found in the Finder include its namesake persistent breadcrumb navigation, shelf (called Drop Stack), transparent archive file browsing, manipulating hidden files, root access, full ACL GUI, batch operations, folder comparison and synchronization, terminal emulator, hex editor, active process viewer, and application launcher. Path Finder can optionally use the same ↵ Return keyboard shortcut to open folders as Windows Explorer, instead of the default ⌘ Cmd+O. It also supports an optional dual-pane UI.

Several features were present earlier in Cocoatech's Path Finder, only later adopted in Apple's Finder, including tabs (added in OS X Mavericks) and an option to keep folders above files.

== Reception ==
In his 2005 review of Mac OS X Tiger, Ars Technica columnist John Siracusa commented that Path Finder "absolutely embarrasses the Mac OS X Finder", and called Path Finder 4 "the Final Cut Pro of file management" and a "file browsing tour de force".

== See also ==
- Comparison of file managers
- File manager
