= WinX MediaTrans =

- Developer: Digiarty Software
- Stable release: 6.4 / Dec-13-2018
- Operating system: Windows 10 and previous
- Size: 46.3 MB
- License: Shareware
- Website: www.winxdvd.com/mediatrans/

WinX MediaTrans is a mobile media file manager software. It helps file synchronization between phones and Windows PC, importing exporting photos, music, videos, and mount iPhone iPad as USB drive. Currently iOS devices are supported only.

== Main features ==
=== 1. Transfer photo ===
WinX MediaTrans is a photo file manager. It transfers photos (HEIC, PG, PNG, BMP) from iOS to computer for saving space. It can also export HEIC photos from iPhone X/8/7 to JPEG for viewing on PC. Exporting 100 4K pictures from iPhone to PC takes 8 seconds. Transferring pictures from PC to iOS is not supported.

=== 2. Sync music ===
Music synchronization between iPhone, iPad and computer is permitted. Also it can create, edit and delete music playlist, as well as edit music information, including artist, title, album, etc.

=== 3. Import/export video ===
Importing videos from computer to iOS devices is enabled with this app and vice versa. It supports converting videos incompatible with iOS to supported formats before the syncing. Hardware acceleration is permitted as well. And videos transferred from PC to iPhone will be auto rotated in full screen.

== See also ==
- Comparison of file managers
