= Krusader =

Dual-pane file manager for KDE desktop environment

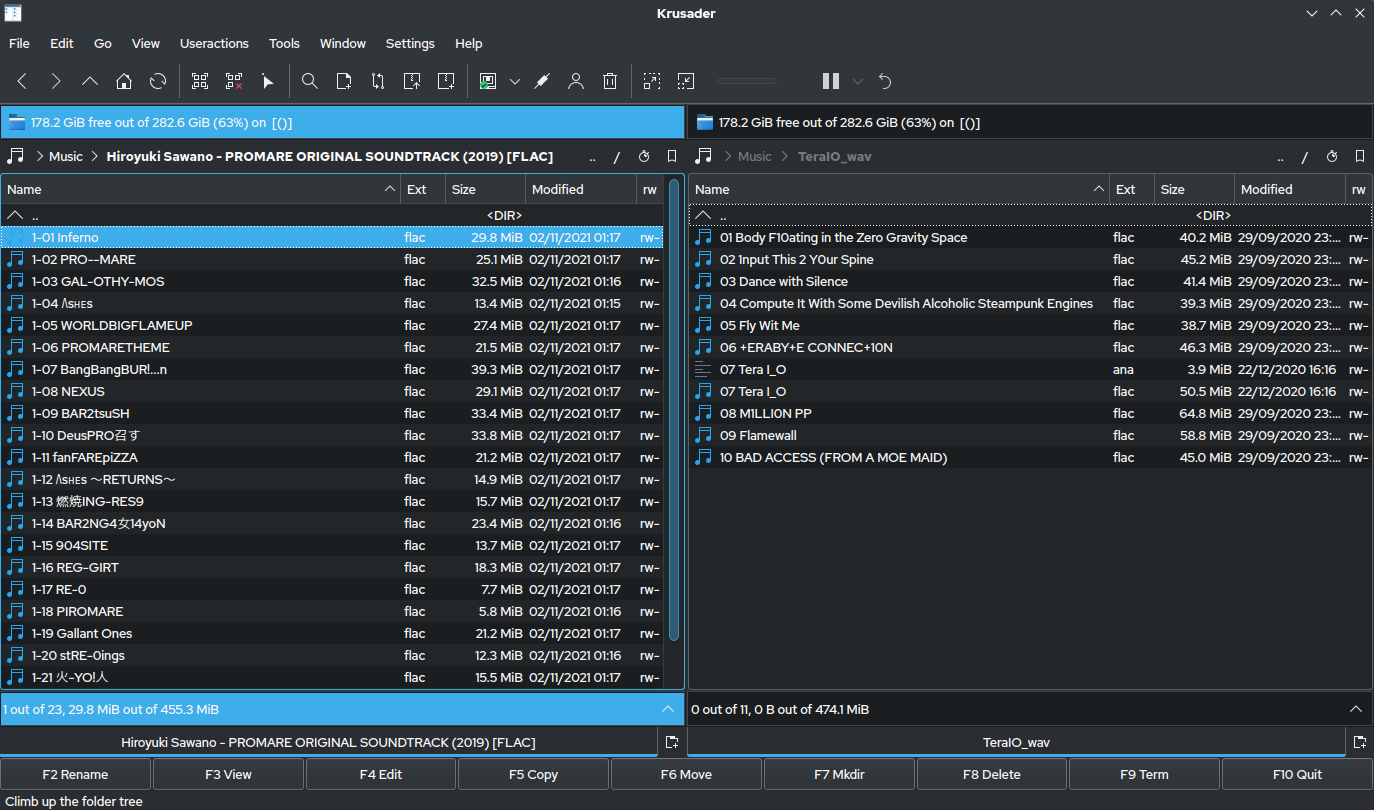
- Krusader twin panel file manager
- Developer: Krusader Krew
- Stable release: R14.1.1 / 20 October 2023
- Repository: invent.kde.org/utilities/krusader
- Written in: C++
- Operating system: Unix-like
- Type: File browser
- License: GPL-2.0-or-later
- Website: krusader.org

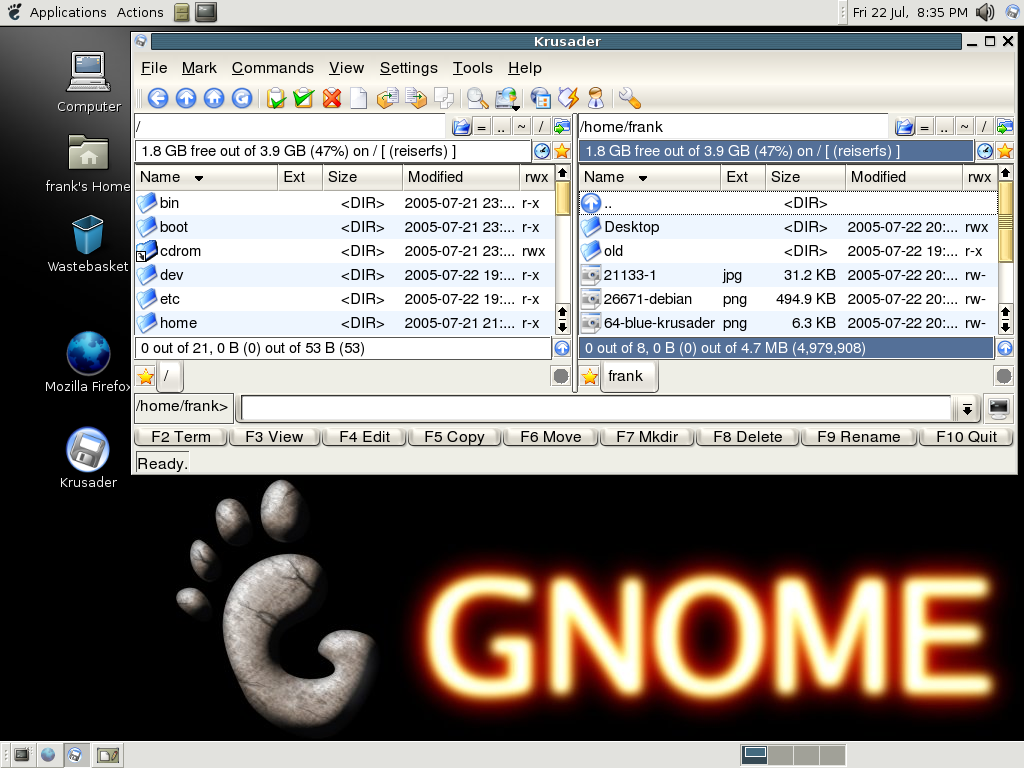
Krusader on Debian Sarge with the Gnome desktop environment

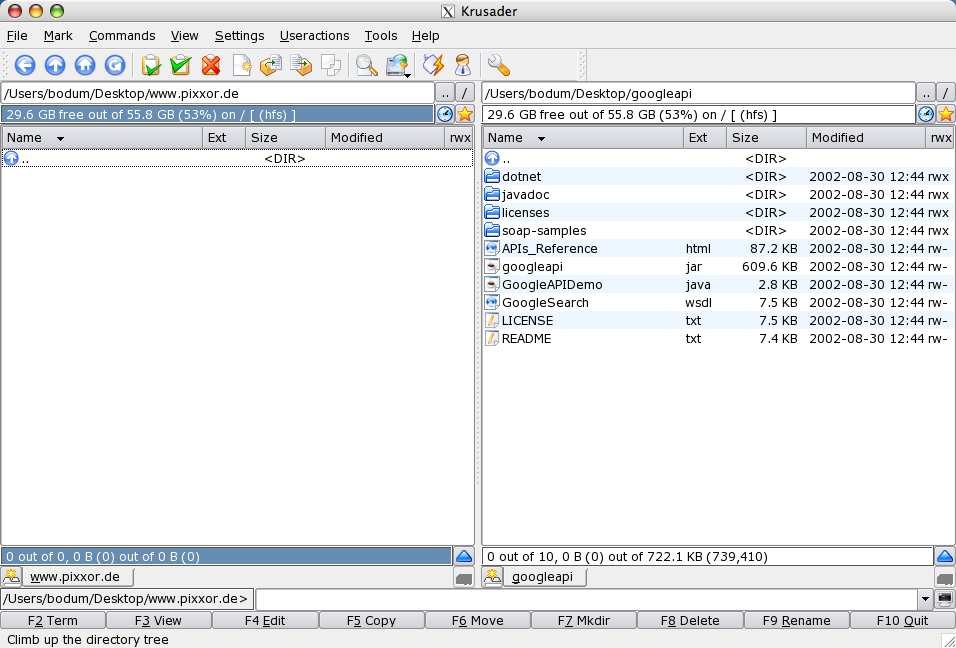
Krusader-1.60.0 / KDE 3.41 on Apple Mac OS X

Krusader is an advanced orthodox file manager for KDE and other desktops in the Unix world. It is similar to the console-based GNU Midnight Commander, GNOME Commander for the GNOME desktop environment, or Total Commander for Windows, all of which can trace their paradigmatic features to the original Norton Commander for MS-DOS. It supports extensive archive handling, mounted filesystem support, FTP, advanced search, viewer/editor, directory synchronisation, file content comparisons, batch renaming, etc.

It supports the following archive formats: tar, ZIP, bzip2, gzip, RAR, ace, ARJ, LHA, 7z and RPM and can handle other KIO Slaves such as smb or fish.

Krusader is published under GNU GPL-2.0-or-later.

== User interface ==
Krusader's user interface is based on the orthodox file manager (OFM) principle, also known as Commander-like file managers, the family of file managers based on the old Norton Commander interface. The orthodox file manager has two windows called panels where one is active and the other inactive. The idea is to manipulate files from active to inactive panel or within the active panel. Only the keyboard is required to do this, which makes the process much faster. Using the mouse is still an option. Krusader's deep integration into KDE (e.g. KParts, KIO) allows it to provide several additional services.

== File viewer-editor ==
One of the many tools that Krusader provides is the viewer-editor. Using the KParts object model, Krusader executes components that are capable of viewing (and sometimes editing) specific filetypes and embeds their client area directly into a new Krusader window. This makes it possible (for example) to view an office document directly from within Krusader. Any application that implements the KParts model correctly can be embedded in this fashion.

== Platforms ==
Krusader is primarily developed for the Linux platform, but it is available for some other platforms. These include BSD and Apple Mac OS X. A Windows port is in beta (as of January 9, 2015).

== See also ==
- Comparison of file managers
