= Nnn (file manager) =

Free and open-source terminal file manager

nnn

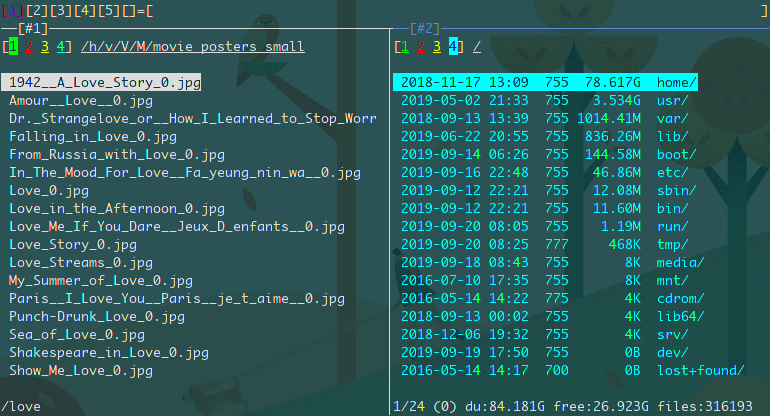
- Developer: Arun Prakash Jana
- Initial release: April 13, 2017; 8 years ago
- Stable release: 5.1 / 23 March 2025
- Repository: github.com/jarun/nnn
- Written in: C
- Operating system: Linux; FreeBSD macOS; OpenBSD; Haiku
- Size: 243 KB (tar.gz source)
- Available in: English only
- Type: File manager
- License: BSD-2-Clause
- Website: github.com/jarun/nnn

nnn (shortened as n³) is a free and open-source, text-based file manager for Unix-like systems. It is a fork of noice and provides several additional features, while using a minimal memory footprint. It uses low-level functions to access the file system and keeps the number of reads to a minimum, allowing it to perform well on embedded devices. As the base program follows a minimal design philosophy, additional features and functionality are available via user plugins.

== Operation ==
Each instance of nnn provides four "contexts", or tabs, which allow to browse multiple directories within the same instance. From within nnn, basic file operations such as adding, duplicating, moving, removing and renaming files are available. Additionally, it supports mass file renaming and mounting remote drives via sshfs. One unique feature is that separate instances of nnn can share the selection that has been made in one of the running instances.

The file structure can be browsed with the keyboard or mouse. In larger directories, it is recommended to filter out the results via a text search string or regular expression.

== Configuration ==
nnn retains most of its configuration to environment variables or command line arguments. Additional functionality can be installed via plugins that can be activated via an extra menu or adding keybindings for them.

== See also ==
- Comparison of file managers
- ranger, a file manager based on ncurses and Python
- Midnight Commander, an older ncurses-based file manager
