= Ztree =

ZTree or z-Tree may refer to:

- z-Tree programming language, a software tool for experimental economics
- ZTreeWin, a navigational file manager for Microsoft Windows
- zTree, a plugin for jQuery
