= PCMan File Manager =

File manager

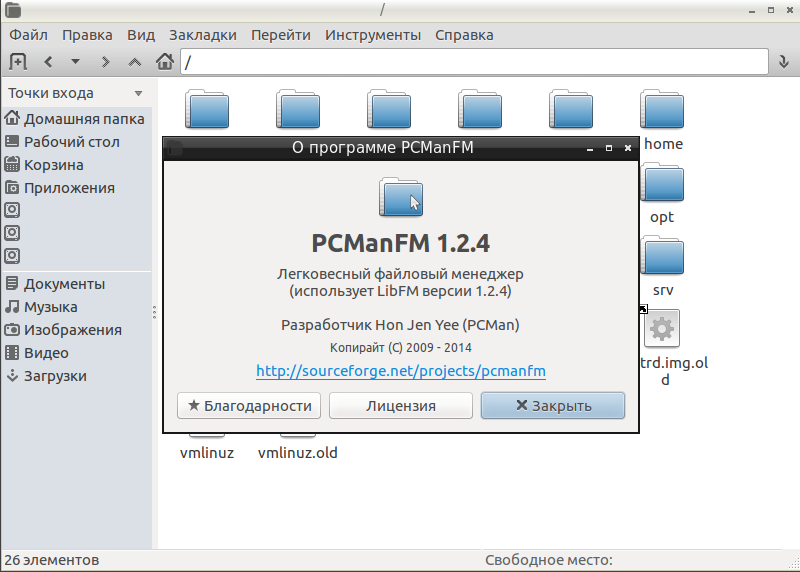
- PCMan File Manager 1.2.4 in Russian
- Developers: Hong Jen Yee (PCMan), Andriy Grytsenko (LStranger)
- Stable release: 2.1.0 (Qt) / November 5, 2024; 21 months ago
- Written in: C (GTK), C++ (Qt)
- Operating system: Unix-like
- Type: File Manager
- License: GPL-2.0-or-later
- Website: https://github.com/lxqt/pcmanfm-qt
- Repository: github.com/lxde/pcmanfm

PCMan File Manager (PCManFM) is a file manager application, developed by Hong Jen Yee (Chinese: 洪任諭; pinyin: Hóng Rènyù) from Taiwan, which is meant to be a replacement for GNOME Files, Dolphin and Thunar. PCManFM was the standard file manager in LXDE until it was discontinued, and it remains the standard file manager for LXQt. Since 2010, PCManFM has undergone a complete rewrite from scratch; build instructions, setup and configuration have changed in the process.

Released under the GNU General Public License, PCManFM is free software. It follows the specifications given by Freedesktop.org for interoperability.

Dissatisfied with GTK3, Hong Jen Yee experimented with Qt in early 2013 and released the first version of a Qt-based PCManFM on March 26, 2013. The new PCManFM-Qt has since replaced the original version and is a core component of the LXQt desktop environment.

== Features ==
PCManFM's features include:

- Full GVfs support with seamless access to remote file systems (able to handle sftp://, dav://, smb://, etc. when related back-ends of gvfs are installed.)
- Twin panel
- Thumbnails for pictures
- Desktop management - shows wallpaper and desktop icons
- Bookmarks
- Multilingual
- Tabbed browsing (similar to a web browser)
- Volume management (mount/unmount/eject, requires gvfs)
- Drag & drop support
- Files can be dragged among tabs
- File association (Default application)
- Provides the following views: icon, compact, detailed list, thumbnail, and tree on the left sidebar

== See also ==
- Comparison of file managers
- LXDE
- LXQt
- Thunar
- SpaceFM
