= Navigational file manager =

File management interface

A navigational file manager is a file management interface in which users traverse a filesystem hierarchy's directory structure within a single, continuous viewport rather than opening a distinct window for every individual directory.

== Characteristics ==
Navigational file managers generally feature:

- Single-viewport updating: Selecting a directory updates the contents displayed in the current viewing frame rather than spawning new windows, keeping window management contained.
- Browser-style navigation: Web browser–inspired controls, such as "Back" and "Forward" buttons to traverse navigational history and an "Up" button to move to parent directories.
- Tree-and-list structure: An asymmetric arrangement with a collapsible directory tree or sidebar showing the broader hierarchy, paired with an adjacent pane listing items inside the currently selected folder.
- Hierarchical path representation: The user's location within the tree is reflected dynamically through breadcrumb bars, editable address fields, or cascading column views such as Miller columns.

== Examples ==
- XTree and ZTreeWin
- File Manager (Windows 3.x)
- File Explorer (formerly Windows Explorer) in Microsoft Windows
- Finder in macOS (since Mac OS X 10.0)
- GNOME Files (Nautilus) in GNOME
- Dolphin in KDE
- Thunar in Xfce

== See also ==
- File manager
- Orthodox file manager
- Spatial file manager
