= Nomad.NET =

- Developer: Eugene Sichkar
- Stable release: 3.2.0.2890 / June 13, 2016; 10 years ago
- Operating system: Microsoft Windows
- Type: File manager
- License: Freeware
- Website: http://www.nomad-net.info

Nomad.NET is a freeware orthodox file manager (OFM) for Microsoft Windows. Some features include a built-in FTP client, archive file navigation, folder comparison and synchronization, and a multi-file renaming tool. In addition to being an orthodox file manager, Nomad.NET features two-windowed mode, tree window for each panel, horizontal and vertical splitting of the windows, tab browsing etc.

Nomad.NET is developed with support for multi-threading, taking advantage of multi-core CPUs. Nomad.NET requires Microsoft .NET Framework 2.0 or higher.

== Features ==
The following are the main features of the program:

- Full Unicode support.
- Tabbed interface.
- Bookmarks system.
- Powerful search engines, including definition of complex search rules, searching in hex, duplicates search.
- Powerful filtering system, based on the same core as search.
- Customizable visual themes and icon packs.
- Customizable paneling system: single panel or dual panel mode (horizontal or vertical). Each panel can have its own tree view that can be hidden or displayed horizontally or vertically.
- Full internal support for many archive types (using 7-Zip libraries). Program can also handle WCX Total Commander plug-in.
- FTP folders support.
- Drag and drop from explorer.
- Clipboard handling.
- Support for shell shortcuts, URL shortcuts (FTP only) and even shell folder shortcuts.

== See also ==
- Comparison of file managers
