= ForkLift (file manager) =

- Developers: BinaryNights, LLC
- Release: 1 June 2007; 19 years ago
- Stable release: 4.4.5 / 13 January 2026
- Written in: Swift
- Operating system: macOS
- Size: 44.5 MB
- Available in: 11 languages
- List of languages English, Chinese (Simplified), Czech, French, German, Hungarian, Italian, Polish, Russian, Spanish, Ukrainian
- Type: File manager
- License: Proprietary
- Website: binarynights.com

ForkLift is a dual-pane file manager and file transfer client for macOS, developed by BinaryNights.

== Major releases ==
- ForkLift 1.0 was released on June 1, 2007.
- ForkLift 2.0 was released on November 22, 2010.
- ForkLift 3.0 was released on February 21, 2017.
- ForkLift 4.0, the current version, was released on September 5, 2023.
  - The most recent update of ForkLift 4 was 4.4.5, released on January 13, 2026.

== See also ==
- File manager
- Comparison of file managers
