= Altap Salamander =

Freeware file manager for Microsoft Windows

- Developer: ALTAP
- Stable release: 4.0 / 11 June 2019
- Preview release: 3.0 beta 4 / 29 November 2013
- Written in: C++ and C
- Operating system: Microsoft Windows
- Type: Orthodox file manager
- License: GPL-2.0
- Website: www.altap.cz
- Repository: github.com/OpenSalamander/salamander

Altap Salamander (formerly known as Servant Salamander) is a freeware orthodox file manager for Microsoft Windows, originally inspired by Norton Commander. In contrast to several other file managers, it has a context aware user interface hiding complexity – for instance, the bottom function list changes on press of modifier keys, just showing the currently available hotkey function set.

== Release history ==
Servant Salamander 1.0 development was started in 1996 as a hobby project by Petr Šolín (from Czech Republic) during his studies at university and released as freeware in 1997. It was originally written in Watcom C++, later in Visual C++ 6.0.

Altap Salamander 2.0 the first shareware version was released in 2001 by a newly established company Altap. Salamander 2.0 included support for viewer and archiver plugins. During the development of 2.5 version the plugin architecture was expanded to support file system plugins to support FTP and other protocols.

Altap Salamander 2.5 plugin SDK allows plugin developers to create new viewer plugins (for file previews), archiver plugins (for browsing, unpacking, or packing archive files), file system plugins (for custom directory listing) and tools (like multi-rename or file compare). Custom column plugins known from Total Commander are not supported, neither yet non-latin alphabets of the Unicode.

Altap Salamander 3.x version series newly supports the Windows 7 and higher, two binaries are available, for users' choice: 32-bit and 64-bit.

Altap Salamander 4.0 was released are freeware in 2019 in the aftermath of Altap's acquisition by Fine. however active development has been indefinitely suspended as of July 2019.

Open Salamander 5.0. as open source code was released on December 4, 2023 under the GPL-2.0 license, no packages "releases" are yet published.

In 2025, Samandarin, a community fork of Open Salamander, was released. It retains compatibility with Open Salamander's plugins and adds features such as tabbed panels, Unicode support and a dark mode.

== See also ==
- comparison of file managers
