= Worker (file manager) =

File manager for Unix-like operating systems

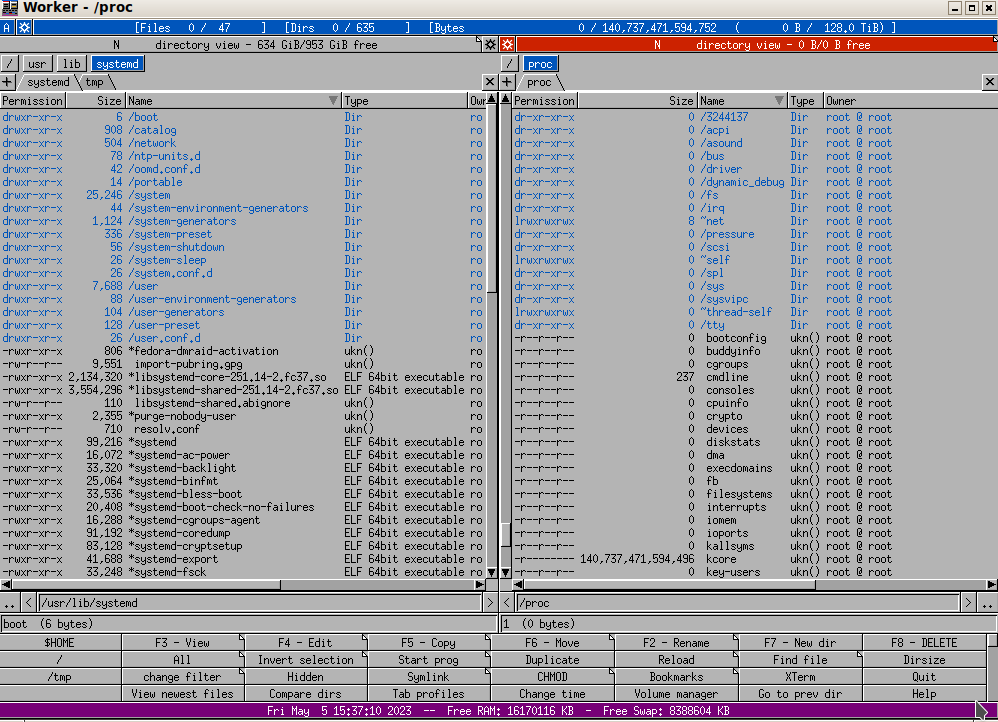
- Worker main window, v.4.11.0
- Developer: Ralf Hoffmann
- Initial release: March 6, 1999; 26 years ago
- Stable release: 5.3.1 / 15 November 2025
- Written in: C++
- Operating system: Unix-like
- Available in: English, German, Czech, Russian, Latvian, Ukrainian, Italian, Polish, Slovak, Dutch, Spanish, French
- Type: File manager
- License: GPL-2.0-or-later
- Website: www.boomerangsworld.de/cms/worker/index.html

Worker is an orthodox file manager, with many advanced features and extendable from configuration and Lua (programming language) scripting designed after Amiga Directory Opus. Dependencies are minimal for X11 on Unix-like operating systems.

Buttons in Worker can be configured to run commands

== See also ==
- Comparison of file managers
