= PathMinder =

MS-DOS Shell Program with integrated text editor and system log

- PathMinder user interface
- Developer: Westlake Data Corporation
- Stable release: 4.50 / 1992
- Operating system: DOS, CP/M
- Type: File manager
- License: Shareware

PathMinder is a file manager software, or DOS shell, originally designed for use under DOS disk operating systems. Published by Westlake Data Corporation of Austin, Texas, and designed by Albert Nurick and Brittain Fraley, it was first released on 30 September 1984 and became fairly popular. Its last major version, 4.50, was released in 1992, and PathMinder was distributed as shareware. Although the user interface was composed of text characters, it had many graphical elements, especially when PathMinder Plus was released in 1989, and the Reconfigurable User Interface was introduced. It was often used as a replacement for DOS Shell on computers with limited memory.

PathMinder won numerous computer industry awards and product comparisons, and was nominated for PC Magazine's Technical Excellence award.

PathMinder was the first DOS shell to incorporate an integrated text editor, the first to include an application manager, activity logging, the ability to run BASIC programs, encryption, and other features.

The program filled a required niche in the market, as DOS shipped with no graphical file manager, until the generally unsuccessful DOS Shell that was provided with MS-DOS 4.

PathMinder had several key features which contributed to its success, including a virtual loader that required only 4 KB of RAM when other programs were running, an important feature when less than 640 KB of RAM were available on systems of the day.

A version of PathMinder was independently developed in 1988 to run on the CP/M operating system.

PathMinder suffered a terminal decline after the widespread usage of Microsoft Windows. Westlake Data released a version of PathMinder designed for the Windows 3.1 operating system called PathMinder Does Windows, but it met with little critical or commercial success.

== See also ==
- Comparison of file managers
