= Xplorer² =

File explorer application for Microsoft Windows

xplorer² pro/ultimate
- Developer: Nikos Bozinis
- Stable release: 6.3.0.0 / February 18, 2026; 7 months ago
- Platform: Microsoft Windows
- Size: 4.0 MB (32 bit), 4 MB (64 bit)
- Type: File manager
- License: Commercial proprietary
- Website: www.zabkat.com

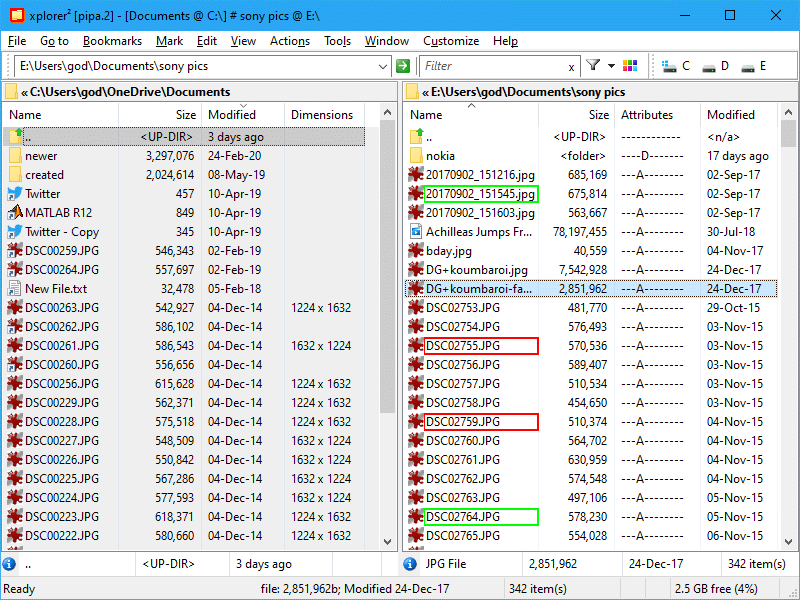
Traditional dual pane interface with file details.

xplorer² Lite
- Developer: Nikos Bozinis
- Stable release: 6.2.0.3 / September 1, 2025; 13 months ago
- Platform: Microsoft Windows
- Size: 4 MB
- Type: File manager
- License: Freeware
- Website: www.zabkat.com/x2lite.htm

xplorer² (formerly 2xExplorer) is a dual-pane file manager for Microsoft Windows operating systems, developed by Nikos Bozinis (Nikolaos Achilleos Bozinis). It offers the functionality of orthodox file managers through an interface similar to the familiar Windows Explorer. Some of its features are tabbed file management within each pane, viewing and editing text files, searching for files using arbitrary criteria, the ability to compare and synchronize folders and the ability to perform queued or concurrent copy and move operations with error handling (robust file transfer). The file finder module is claimed to be “outclass” from other search tools.

xplorer² is fully shell integrated, supporting all windows shell extension handlers that provide preview, text content search and file property information. It also supports many Total Commander WDX/WLX/WCX extension plugins.

Later versions support multi-folder browsing in side-by-side panels (aka Miller columns), detect duplicate and similar files and pictures to clean up hard disk space.

xplorer² comes in two paid varieties, professional and ultimate. The ultimate version is more expensive but includes a faster search engine (it integrates with Windows Search) and is portable (can be run off a USB stick)

Apart from the commercial version of the program, there is also a version which is free for personal and academic use. Three features of the Professional version not present in the Lite version are advanced search (Omni-Finder), full Unicode support and robust transfer.

xplorer² has been in constant development since 2002. Over the years there have been many independent reviews for xplorer². Lifehacker considered it the "best alternative file browser for windows" in a 2011 review, and many reviews rank it among the five best free replacements for Windows Explorer

== See also ==
- Comparison of file managers
