= Volkov Commander =

Shareware file manager for MS-DOS

- Developer: Vsevolod V. Volkov
- Initial release: 1992; 34 years ago
- Stable release: 4.05 / 16 June 2000
- Preview release: 4.99.08 / 2 June 2000
- Written in: x86 assembly
- Operating system: MS-DOS
- Type: File manager
- License: Shareware, Beta
- Website: vc.vvv.kyiv.ua

Volkov Commander (VC) is a file manager for DOS inspired by the Norton Commander. Volkov Commander is purely written in assembly language and is very small (less than 100 KB) and fast.

Volkov Commander was written by Vsevolod V. Volkov, a programmer from Ukraine, born in 1971. The stable version is released as shareware. A preview version is also available, which is interchangeably mentioned as an alpha or beta release on the website. In 2026, the author released source code for VC versions 4.05 and 4.99 under the 2-clause BSD license. The Webmaster for the public face of VC was Daniel R. Egner of Germany.

== Version 4 ==
Version 4.05 is the last fully functional release of the Volkov Commander. It is a pure DOS application, so it doesn't support special features of Windows 9x like long filenames. (Apart from that, it can be used under Windows 9x.) Besides the Russian version, there is an English one. Version 4 is shareware and can be tested free for 30 days.

== Version 4.99 ==
Vsevolod Volkov was working on a new version 5 of his commander (VC 5). It was still in a phase of development. This upgrade works in a Windows 9x / Windows NT or OS/2 environment. VC 5 supports long filenames, and can explore archives (*.zip, *.arc, *.rar, etc.) as though they were directories. When updated last time, the actual beta release was version 4.99.08 alpha. Most of the features of the final release are already available. Though it is a pure DOS application, the new commander supports some of the special features of Windows 95/98/NT. "Beta version (4.99.xx), of course, can be tested for free, because in this stadium of development it does not yet represent a complete program."

== Rumored later version ==
Rumours about existing Version 5 of Volkov Commander:

In the community, someone posted about the existing VC 5. Here is what Vsevolod answered:
[...] VC 5.0 is a fake. The last released version is 4.99.08 alpha. [...] I really didn't release new version for very long time. So, development of VC is hold in fact. But I don't exclude possibility of new releases. I have no roadmap and could not promise something."

VC 4.99.08 is included within Ultimate Boot CD (UBCD) v3.4, as part of the general FreeDOS base package.

Volkov Commander is included in the NwDsk DOS network boot disk.

== See also ==
- Comparison of file managers
- Orthodox file manager
