= Demos Commander =

File manager for Unix-like systems

- Developer(s): Serge Vakulenko
- Stable release: 3.9 / March 6, 2001
- Operating system: Unix-like
- Type: File manager
- License: GPL
- Website: https://deco.sourceforge.net/

Demos Commander (deco) is an orthodox file manager for Unix-like systems and a clone of Norton Commander. The project started by Sergey Vakulenko in 1989 while working at the DEMOS ISP (thus the name Demos Commander: deco) and is considered one of the first orthodox file managers for the Unix-like systems.

== Interface ==
Demos Commander is a text-mode application. The main interface consists of two panels, which display the file system. It is used in a similar way to many other programs run in the Unix shell. Arrow keys control file selection, the insert key is used to select files (but not directories), and the function keys perform operations such as renaming, editing and copying files. Unlike many full-screen programs that run in console, Demos Commander is not capable of resizing itself when the console changes resolution (for example, when an xterm window is resized) nor able to support any other console resolution than 80×24.

== Small footprint ==
While lacking features found in more elaborate OFM programs, Demos Commander is suited for rescue-disk setups and for very limited systems (such as 486-based systems) because of its small memory footprint (less than 1 MiB), small binary size (a few hundred KiB) and close to zero dependencies (only ncurses is required).

== Current development ==
Demos Commander appears to no longer be under active development, with the last version released in 2001 in source code form and a User's Manual for version 3.2.2 in 1993.

== See also ==
- Orthodox file manager
- Midnight Commander
- Norton Commander
- Comparison of file managers
