= EmelFM2 =

emelFM2
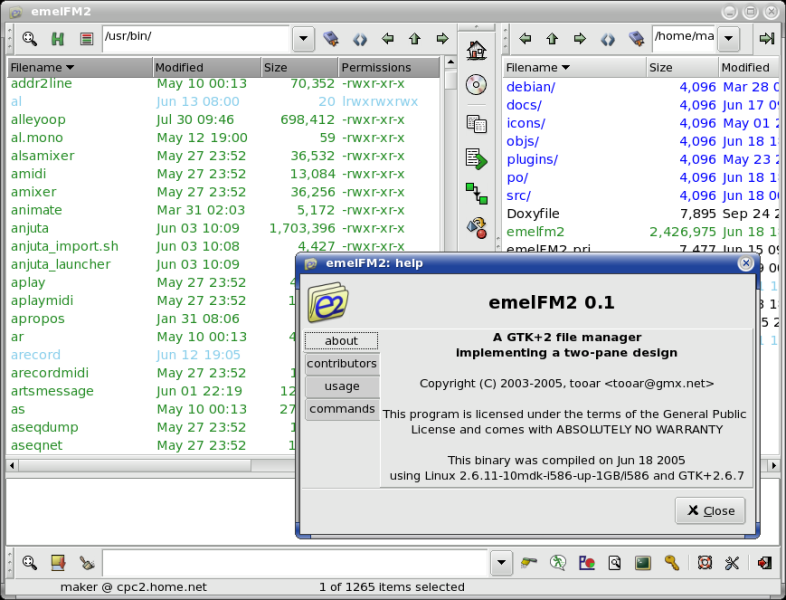
- emelFM2, v. 0.1
- Developer: tooar
- Operating system: BSD, Linux and other Unix-like operating systems
- Type: File manager
- License: emelFM2: GPL-3.0-or-later emelFM: GPL-2.0-or-later
- Website: emelfm.sourceforge.net
- Repository: svn.emelfm2.net/trunk/

emelFM2 is an orthodox file manager which uses the GTK+ 2 widget toolkit for X11 on Unix-like operating systems. The default window layout is two filesystem directories in the left and right panes similar to that found in Norton Commander, a strip down the middle with commonly used commands to operate on files in one or both of these browsing panes, and a log which shows the output of commands at the bottom. This layout is configurable - for example, the panes can be reorganized so that the directory panes are stacked vertically or it can be set to have only one directory pane. The colors, icons, included functions and file descriptor columns are all configurable.

emelFM2 ships with the function keys bound to the common commands; those keybindings can be customized.

emelFM2 can handle archives and mounted filesystems. Every feature, including user-created functions, can be used through the GUI or with keyboard shortcuts.

== See also ==
- Comparison of file managers
