= STDU Explorer =

- Developer: STDUtility
- Release: March 23, 2009; 17 years ago
- Stable release: 1.0.517 / July 18, 2013; 13 years ago
- Written in: C++
- Operating system: Windows
- Type: File manager
- License: Freeware
- Website: web.archive.org/web/20150224145333/http://stdutility.com/stduexplorer.html

STDU Explorer is a file manager for previewing and managing PDF, DjVu, Comic Book Archive (CBR or CBZ), XPS and image file formats such as BMP, GIF, JPEG, PNG, PSD and WMF. It works under Microsoft Windows, and is free for non-commercial use.

== Features ==
STDU Explorer supports standard operations such as cut, copy, paste, move, delete, rename, context menu integration and tree views of folders. The program has a preview pane for flipping through multipage files, it can generate adjustable thumbnail previews of the images and the content of PDF e-books.

== See also ==
- Comparison of file managers
- STDU Viewer
