= XYplorer =

File explorer application for Microsoft Windows

- Screenshot of old XYplorer Pro v14.50
- Developer: Donald Lessau
- Release: December 5, 1999; 26 years ago
- Stable release: 28.40.0100 / September 24, 2026; 3 days ago
- Operating system: Microsoft Windows
- Size: 10.2 MB
- Available in: 30 languages
- Type: File Manager
- License: Trialware (30-day trial, retail)
- Website: www.xyplorer.com
- As of: September, 2026

XYplorerFree
- Developer: Donald Lessau
- Release: January 2, 2014; 12 years ago
- Final release: 17.40.0100 / November 26, 2016; 9 years ago
- Operating system: Microsoft Windows
- Size: 3.8 MB
- Available in: 23 languages
- Type: File Manager
- License: Freeware
- Website: www.xyplorer.com/free.php
- As of: September, 2026

XYplorer (pronounced X-Y-plorer or Zai-plorer, formerly known as TrackerV3) is a file manager for Windows XP, Vista, 7, 8, 10, and 11. XYplorer is a hybrid file manager that combines features found in navigational and orthodox file managers. In addition to dual folder panes it features a file tree and a tabbed interface supporting drag-and-drop between tabs and panes. The program used to be available as Pro and Free versions. The Free version is still available as a feature-limited freeware version. The "Pro" was then dropped and just known as "XYPlorer". The program is available in a fully featured trialware version.

== Features ==
- Portable by default.
- Dual folder panes and tabs.
- Folder tree (regular or "Mini Tree" which hides uncommonly used folders).
- Catalog, which is a user created panel of links to files, folders, URLs, shortcuts, and similar entries.
- Customizable toolbars, keyboard shortcuts.
- Scripting.
- Batch rename.
- Advanced search (regex, Boolean logic, content search) and live filter box.
- Built-in copy handler that supports queuing tasks. External copy handlers are supported.
- Virtual "paper folders" for managing collections of items in different locations.
- Text tags, color labels and comments for files and folders.
- Visual filters and color coding based on file properties and meta data.
- Previewing of most common file types.
- Folder view settings allows individual folders to have individual view configurations. This includes choice between thumbnails or detailed list with custom columns, and visual filters.
- File comparison using hash values.
- Undo/redo of file operations, optionally stored between sessions.
- Customizable/modular interface where unwanted features can be turned off.

=== Description of features ===
A central feature is the hideable information panel at the bottom that can be used to view file properties and contents, generate reports, preview files (PNG, TIF, GIF, JPG, TGA, PSD, ICO; WAV, MP3, MPEG, AVI; TTF, PFB; HTML, EML, MSG, DOC, XLS, PDF, and many other formats) and find files. The search facility supports Boolean logic, regular expressions, whole word and fuzzy matching, binary string search, and multiple location search.

Some unique features are the Catalog, (which is a user created panel of links to files, folders, URLs, shortcuts, and similar entries), Scripting (which allows user to create stored sets of commands, similar to a macro), Mini Tree (a custom subset of the tree) and UDC (User Defined Commands, to create a limited set of customized commands). Other features includes advanced batch renaming capabilities, custom file copiers (supports file verifications, pause and resume, and course of action on file collisions), highly customizable color-coding for files (aka Color Filters. Allows color-coding of files based on one or more combinations of file types, dates, age, and size), and highly customizable visual filters allowing only certain files and folders to be displayed depending on the filter criteria. Also available is flat file viewing that allows parent folders to be seen in the same window.

XYplorer is continually developed with regular beta releases. Recently added features include Live Filtering, Sync Folders, Filtered Sync and Touchscreen Mode.

XYplorer is a portable (stand-alone) file manager. It does not require any installation, stores all data in the program's folder or a user defined folder, and running it does not change the system or registry unless by user request to set XYplorer as the default file manager or add to Windows context menu.

Historically, the application was first a search engine, and later grew into a more complete file manager.

Starting with version 12.00 (released January 2013), XYplorer became multilingual. In January 2018 it was available in 24 languages.

== License types ==
As of December 2021, XYplorer is offered under a "Lifetime License" that gives access to unlimited updates for life and a cheaper "Standard License" that allows updates for a year.

=== Previous versions and license changes ===
XYplorer has been actively developed by Donald Lessau since 1997, originally dual-licensed as either freeware for non-commercial use or a professional license.

The "XYplorer Lifetime License" was unavailable for 6 months starting January 28, 2013, but on popular demand it was made available again on July 23, 2013. Additionally, "XYplorer Standard Licence Pro" users can upgrade to lifetime licenses at a discount price.

A feature-limited freeware version of XYplorer, XYplorerFree, was made available starting January 2, 2014. On January 10, 2017, it was announced that XYplorerFree had been discontinued. The last free version is still available as of December 2021.

An older freeware version which was available from November 2007 to May 2008 is now obsolete for current operating systems. A feature-limited Home Edition has also previously been available for a lower price.

== See also ==
- Comparison of file managers
