= MuCommander =

Cross-platform file manager

muCommander
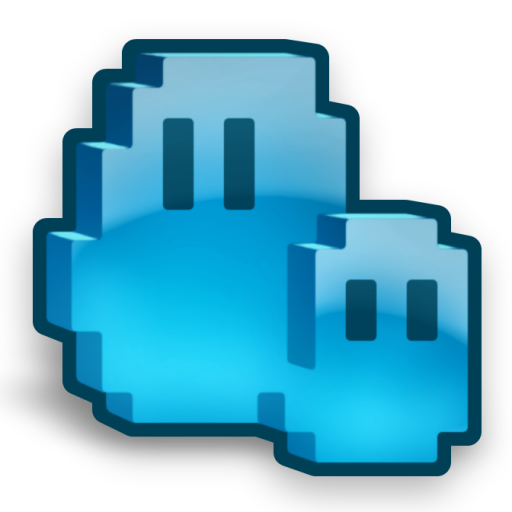

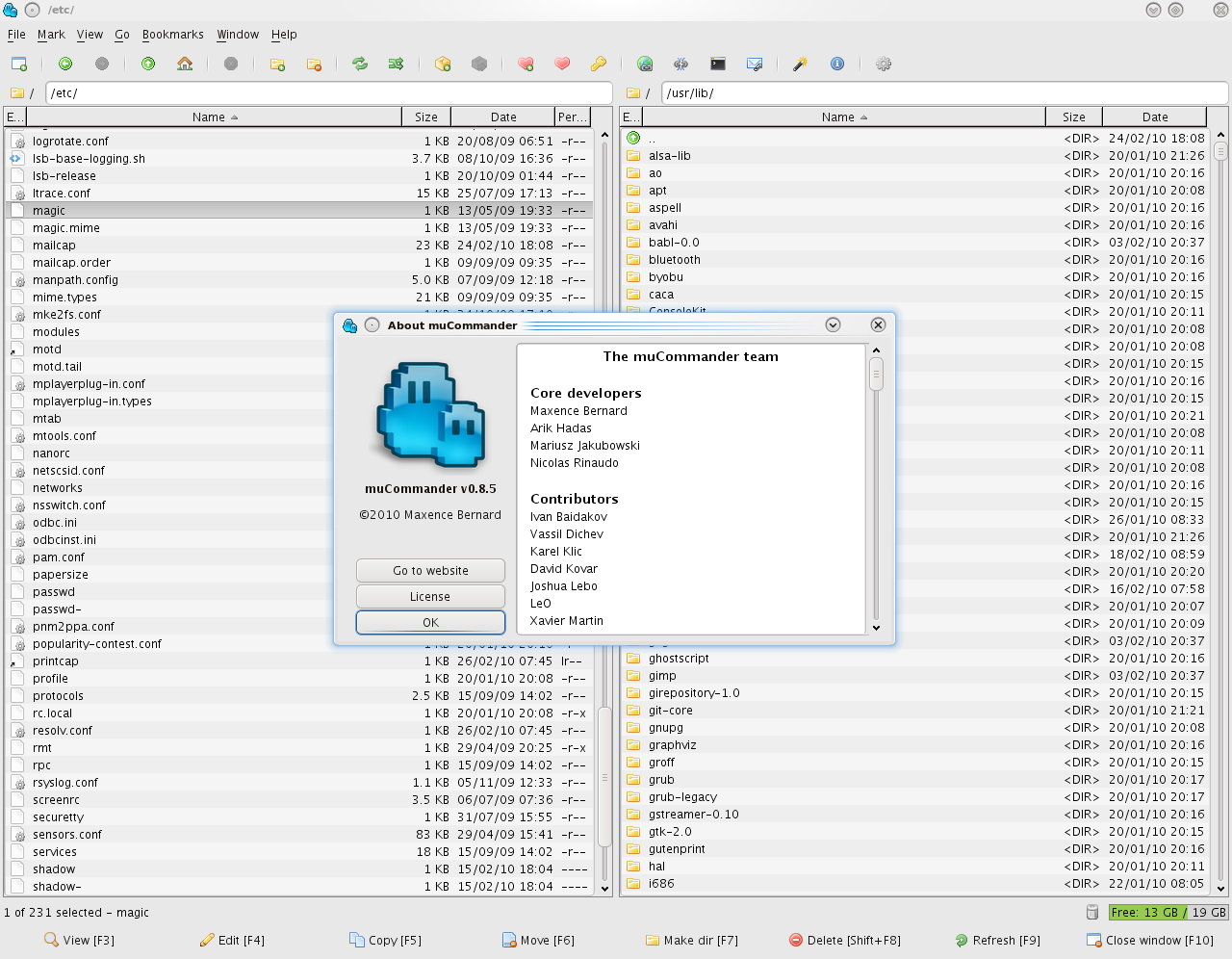
- Developer: Arik Hadas
- Stable release: 1.5.2 / 18 October 2024
- Written in: Java
- Operating system: Unix-like, Microsoft Windows, macOS
- Available in: 23 languages
- Type: File manager
- License: GPL-3.0-or-later
- Website: www.mucommander.com
- Repository: github.com/mucommander/mucommander

muCommander is an open-source, cross-platform file manager that runs on operating systems supporting Java 11 or later. It has a Norton Commander style, and a dual-pane interface to allow manipulation of files via keyboard shortcuts. Pre-compiled builds are available for macOS, Microsoft Windows, Linux, Solaris, FreeBSD, and OpenVMS. It is based on GNU Midnight Commander, but has a GUI compared to Midnight Commander.

== See also ==
- Comparison of file managers
