= WebDrive =

Drive mapping software

- Original author: John C. Glavin
- Developer: South River Technologies (originally Riverfront Software)
- Release: December 31, 1997; 28 years ago
- Stable release: v2019 / February 26, 2019; 7 years ago
- Operating system: Windows, OS X, Android and iOS
- Available in: English
- License: Proprietary
- Website: https://www.webdrive.com

WebDrive is a drive mapping utility that supports accessing remote file servers using open FTP, FTPS, SFTP, and WebDAV protocols, and proprietary or vendor-specific protocols. It can be run as a Windows service and supports automatic mounting on system startup.

== History and use ==
Though associated with traditional FTP protocols, WebDrive has had a long history of being considered a unique type of FTP client because it made remote folders look like part of the native operating system's file manager rather than display a "two pane" view (a.k.a. an "orthodox file manager") used by most FTP clients. As of 2014, its publisher claimed over 5 million installations and it remains a popular utility on college campuses and similar organizations with "casual" file transfer needs.

A Mac edition was introduced in September 2009 and mobile editions for the iOS and Android were introduced in November 2013 and March 2014 respectively.

Through at least 2002 Novell rebranded an earlier version of WebDrive as NetDrive and also added iFolder transfer support to its rebranded edition.

== See also ==
- Comparison of WebDAV software
- Comparison of file managers
