= Explorer++ =

File manager for Microsoft Windows

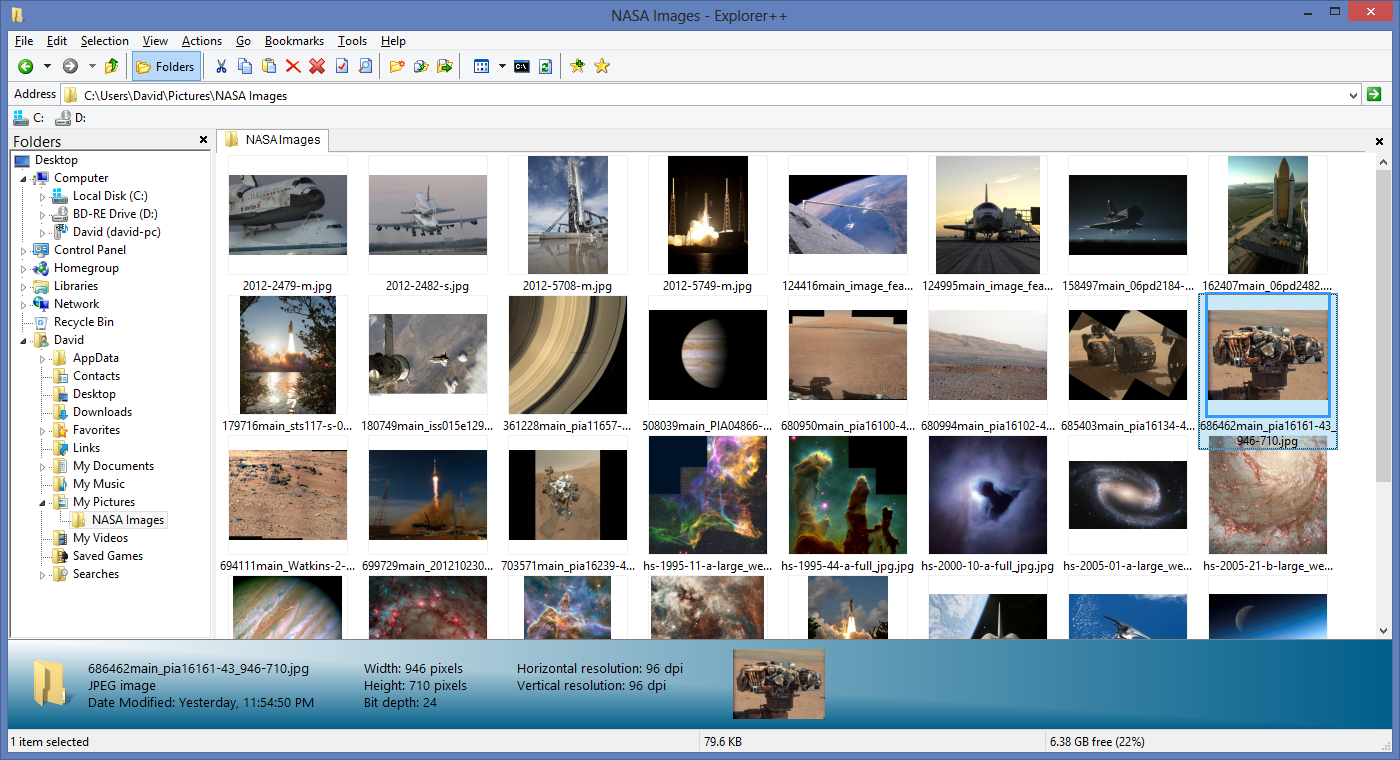
- Explorer++ file manager in Windows 8
- Developer: David Erceg
- Release: June 1, 2008
- Stable release: 1.4.0 / 28 January 2024
- Preview release: 1.4.0 beta 2 / 1 November 2020
- Operating system: Windows
- Type: File manager
- License: GPL-3.0-only
- Website: explorerplusplus.com https://web.archive.org/web/20250703091102/https://explorerplusplus.com/

Explorer++ is a free and open-source navigational file manager for Microsoft Windows. It features multi-tabbed panes, bookmarks menu, and a customizable user interface. It can be configured to run portably or use the registry. It can also be set to replace Windows Explorer as the default file manager.

The original version of these is the original source of the commercial PowerDesk Pro file manager now sold by Avanquest. They still share certain features but each has added different features.

== See also ==
- Comparison of file managers
