= Gentoo (file manager) =

File manager

gentoo file manager
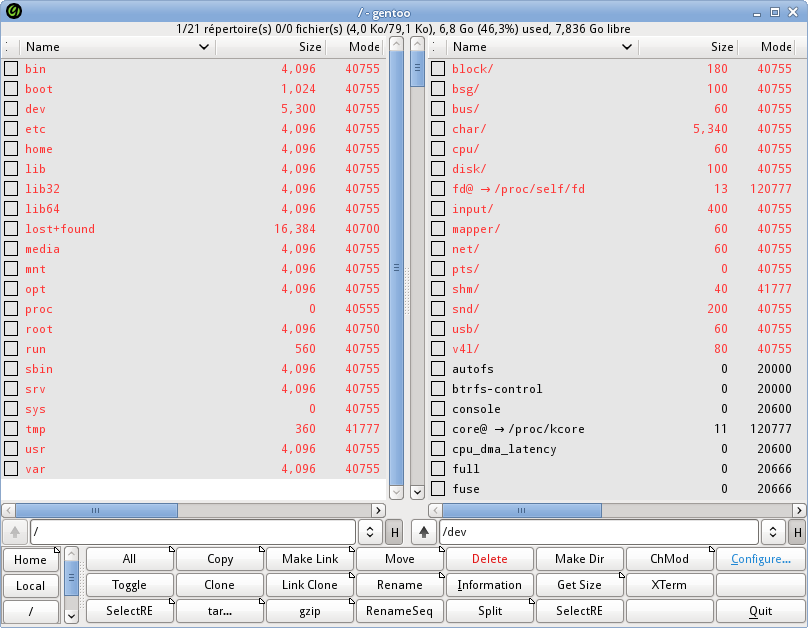
- gentoo screenshot
- Developer: Emil Brink
- Initial release: September 1998; 27 years ago
- Written in: C
- Operating system: Unix-like
- Type: File manager
- License: GPL-2.0-only
- Website: sourceforge.net/projects/gentoo/

gentoo is a free file manager for Linux and other Unix-like computer systems created by Emil Brink.

Using the two-pane concept, it is reminiscent of Total Commander and Norton Commander but it actually attempts to capture the look and feel of Directory Opus — a notable file manager on the Amiga.

Notable features of gentoo include that it can be configured completely in a graphic user interface, and its file typing and styling system. Its file typing system identifies each file's type and then uses the respective style definition to determine how to display it in listings. The package includes over a hundred icons for different file types, handcrafted especially for gentoo to be legible at small scale.

gentoo was written in C using the GTK+ toolkit, and is recognised for being lightweight and fast.

== Name ==
The word gentoo refers to a fast breed of penguin, the gentoo penguin. In spite of the name, it has nothing to do with the Gentoo Linux distribution, and has been around longer.

== See also ==
- Comparison of file managers
