= WWF (file format) =

Campaign to produce PDF electronic documents that forbid printing

- Filename extension: .wwf
- Extended from: PDF

WWF is a modification of the open standard PDF format for document exchange endorsed by the World Wide Fund for Nature (also abbreviated WWF) Germany. The WWF format is promoted as being more environmentally friendly than other comparable document exchange formats (e.g. PDF or DOC) since documents in this format are designed to be more difficult to print. The motivation behind the use of the format is to prevent unnecessary printing of documents. The website claims that the file format will be able to be read by most programs that can open ordinary PDF files. At present, the software for creating WWF files is available for Mac OS X 10.4 and for Windows XP and later. An open-source equivalent is available for Linux and for Windows XP and later.

== Technical details ==
WWF files are simply PDF files with the security settings for printing set to "not allowed", and the file extension ".wwf". Thus, the inability to print the files comes from the DRM built into Adobe Reader, which looks at a flag in the PDF to see whether printing is allowed. Other PDF readers, such as Ghostscript, may not honour the no-print flag, rendering WWF files printable by those readers.

== Criticism ==
The initiative has been criticised for restricting users rights, being ineffective (as non-Adobe readers such as Ghostscript can print documents in the format), for violating the BSD license, for being incompatible with the goals of the free and open source software movement and for the software contacting the WWF without the user's consent. It was criticised by WWF International director of corporate relations Maria Boulos for being "misleading" and having been launched as "a global product" despite being created by the WWF's German division without consultation with WWF International.
