= NetDrive =

- Stable release: 4.0
- Preview release: 4.1
- Operating system: MS Windows
- Available in: English
- License: Requires NetWare license/ closed source

NetDrive is a drive mapping utility based on WebDrive technology initially developed by South River Technologies and licensed by Novell for distribution with Novell NetWare servers. NetDrive uses the iFolders protocol to map a drive letter on a Windows workstation to a NetWare server. This software's features are:

- Data transfer by drag and drop files in Windows Explorer
- Able to execute .exe files including video and audio files
- Able to run NetDrive as a system service when Windows starts
- Mounts drive automatically on system start
- Supports FTP, WebDAV and iFolder.

The software has been discontinued by Novell, and is no longer available from that company.
