= XTree =

File manager program

- XtreeGold 3.0
- Original author: Jeffrey C. Johnson
- Developer: Executive Systems Inc. (ESI)
- Release: April 1, 1985; 41 years ago
- Operating system: DOS, Microsoft Windows
- Type: file manager

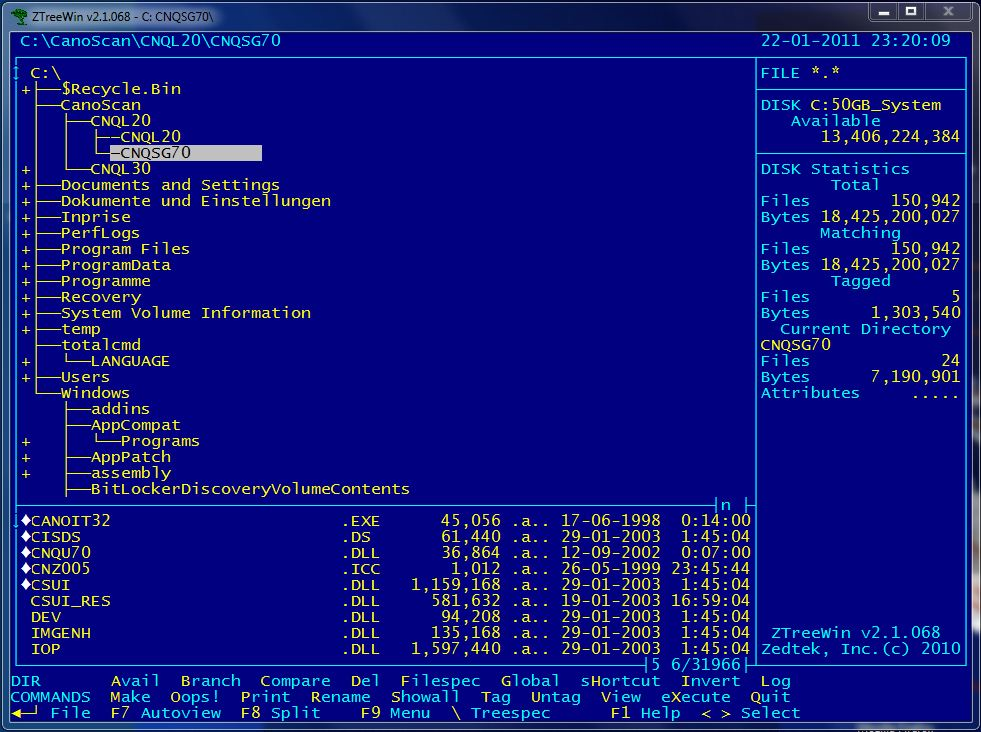
ZTreeWin 2.1

XTree is a file manager program originally designed for use under DOS. It was published by Executive Systems, Inc. (ESI) and first released on 1 April 1985, and became highly popular. The program uses a character-mode interface, which has many elements typically associated with a graphical user interface.

The program filled an acquired niche in the market, as DOS relied on command-line file management, until the generally unsuccessful DOS Shell shipped with MS-DOS 4.0. Even then, the speed and features of XTreeGold were superior — specifically support for the Zip compression format and ability to undelete files. The program also has the benefit of requiring very little memory, essential at a time when less than 640 kB of memory was available for programs to run.

== History ==
XTree 1.0 was officially introduced on April 1, 1985, at the West Coast Computer Faire and sold for $39.95. Work had begun on XTree in December 1984. The primary developer was Jeffery C. Johnson, who was working for a company named Executive Systems, Inc. (ESI). Additional contributions were made by ESI owners Dale Sinor, Tom Smith, and Henry Hernandez, as well as Ken Broomfield, who provided quality assurance. The XTree name was the concept of Johnson's wife, Arletta, who had made the suggestion: "'XTree'. You know, like 'X-Tree, X-Tree. Read all about it!'". Johnson was the originator of the visual directory tree concept first used in an Epson backup product created by ESI. Johnson describes the creation of a visual directory tree as follows: 'Everyone in the room when I first drew it on a whiteboard [...] When I sat down, Tom and Dale both said "it can't be done." Henry, on the other hand, could read me like a book, and seeing the look in my eyes said something like, "... possible, but not on today's computers." That was a Friday afternoon, it was running by Monday morning and by the end of the day verified as being accurate by an office full of skeptics.

By 1988 XTree was, InfoWorld said, "perhaps the most popular DOS shell on the market". The TREE command found in later DOS releases displayed directories in a markedly similar fashion. By 1991, XTree had sold over 3 million copies and was released in over a half-dozen languages.

Even in its earliest version XTree contained features like listing all files of a branch, including subdirectories, listing of all files on a disk, or viewing a file's contents in text or hexadecimal format (regardless of its file extension), a feature never added to the built-in Windows file manager.

XTree was supplemented by the enhanced XTreePro in 1988, which added features for working with multiple disk drives, speed improvements, and brought the keyboard commands more in line with other common DOS programs. A version of XTreePro with Novell NetWare connectivity debuted in late 1988. XTreeProGold/XTreeGold succeeded Xtree Pro in 1989, adding pull-down menus to enhance the interface, additional file viewers, and the choice of a Norton Commander-style split pane between locations on different disks. The first GUI-enabled XTree product was XTreeMac, also launched in 1989, which brought the XTree interface metaphors to the Macintosh System as a Finder replacement. While the Macintosh System software already had competent file management, XTreeMac made it easier to move and copy files and added undeletion and enhanced file finding tools.

Also in 1989, the company ran a four-month "Software Amnesty for Everyone", allowing users of unauthorized copies of XTree to register them for a small fee. Five thousand licenses were sold for $20 each.

XTree suffered a terminal decline after the widespread adoption of Microsoft Windows. The built-in Windows file manager had a vaguely similar appearance to XTree, and while it lacked the speed, keyboard shortcuts and power, it did benefit greatly from being included with Windows.

In 1992 XTree for Windows was released. The product dropped many of the features liked in the DOS versions, with undeletion and file editing particularly noticeable by their absence. The program also took considerably longer to load than both DOS Xtree and other Windows file managers, and operations like viewing files were slower. Despite this, features like native support for file compression and a wide range of file viewers made it the most feature complete Windows file manager of that year. It was not a success for the company. In 1993, the XTree Company was sold to Central Point Software, which was in turn acquired by Symantec in 1994, and in 1995 production of XTree products was halted.

== Reception ==
"By far the best of the housekeeping programs is Xtree" 2.0, Edward Mendelson said in The Yale Review in 1986, especially for hard disk users: "Xtree is a pleasure to use but never a distraction". InfoWorld in January 1988 described XTree Pro as "the Mercedes of DOS shells", with the most features and capabilities but "priced accordingly". Compute! in December 1993 said that XTree for Windows 1.5 "is a fine product and good value".

== Clones ==
The popularity of the program has led many enthusiasts to develop clone versions that work with modern operating systems. Known clones include Xfile, ZTreeWin, UnixTree and Ytree.

The authors and users commonly view these clones as a tribute to the original XTree program, rather than a competitor, especially since XTree is no longer commercially available.

=== UnixTree ===
UnixTree formerly was the official UNIX Systems version of XTree; it was modeled very closely after XTreeGold.

UnixTree is written by Rob Juergens and is Free software, released under the terms of the GNU General Public License.

== See also ==
- Comparison of file managers
