= Files (Apple) =

Mobile file management application developed by Apple

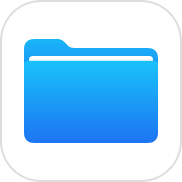

- Home screen
- Developer: Apple Inc.
- Release: September 19, 2017; 9 years ago
- Operating system: iOS 11 and later, iPadOS, visionOS
- Available in: 33 languages
- List of languages English, Arabic, Catalan, Croatian, Czech, Danish, Dutch, Finnish, French, German, Greek, Hebrew, Hindi, Hungarian, Indonesian, Italian, Japanese, Korean, Malay, Norwegian, Bokmål, Polish, Portuguese, Romanian, Russian, Simplified Chinese, Slovak, Spanish, Swedish, Thai, Traditional Chinese, Turkish, Ukrainian, Vietnamese
- Type: File management

Files is a file management app developed by Apple Inc. for devices that run iOS 11 and later or iPadOS. Discovered as a placeholder title in the App Store just prior to the company's 2017 Worldwide Developers Conference, the app was officially announced at the conference shortly thereafter. Files allows users to browse local files stored within apps, as well as files stored in cloud storage services including iCloud, Dropbox, OneDrive, and Google Drive. It allows for the saving, opening and organization of files, including placement into structured folders and sub-folders. iPadOS and recent versions of iOS are able to drag-and-drop files between Files and other apps, while iOS versions before iOS 15 are limited to drag-and-drop inside Files itself. Further organization can be done through the use of color-coded or custom-named tags, and a persistent search bar allows for finding files inside folders, though not inside other apps. A list view enables different sorting options. The app offers the exclusive playback of high-quality FLAC audio files, and also offers support for viewing text files, images, "Music Memos", and Zip archives, as well as limited support for video.

== History ==
Hours before Apple's June 5, 2017 Worldwide Developers Conference, developer Steve Troughton-Smith discovered a placeholder title in the App Store for a "Files" app, requiring iOS 11. Apple officially announced the app at its conference shortly thereafter.

== Features ==
Files allows users to browse local files stored within apps, as well as files stored on cloud storage services including iCloud, Box, Dropbox, Google Drive, OneDrive, and more. Users are able to save, open, and organize files, including placing files into structured folders and sub-folders. On the iPad, users can drag-and-drop files between the Files app and other apps. On the iPhone the functionality was initially limited to only inside each respective app but was later updated to behave like on the iPad. Users can add colored and custom-named tags to files, adding them to a dedicated "Tags" section. A persistent search bar at the top enables finding files inside sub-folders, though it doesn't search within other apps. A list view enables optional sorting according to size or date.

Upon long-pressing a file, the app offers several options, including "Copy", "Rename", "Move", "Share", "Tags", "Info", and "Delete". Files stored on third-party services can be copied to the device for offline access. iCloud Sharing is brought out from Apple's dedicated iWork apps to become a standardized feature across the operating system, enabling the sharing of any file in Files; the dedicated "iCloud Drive" app is removed, replaced by Files, with iCloud available as one of the cloud storage providers users can connect the app to..

A built-in player inside the Files app allows for the playback of high-quality FLAC audio files. The app also supports the viewing and extraction of Zip archives. If no compatible app is installed, Files allows for the viewing of text files, and experiments in watching videos in AVI or MOV formats have shown limited, but partially successful, results. Images and "Music Memo" files can also be previewed and played.

== See also ==
- Finder (software)
- Files (Google)
