= Ranger (file manager) =

Text-based file manager

ranger
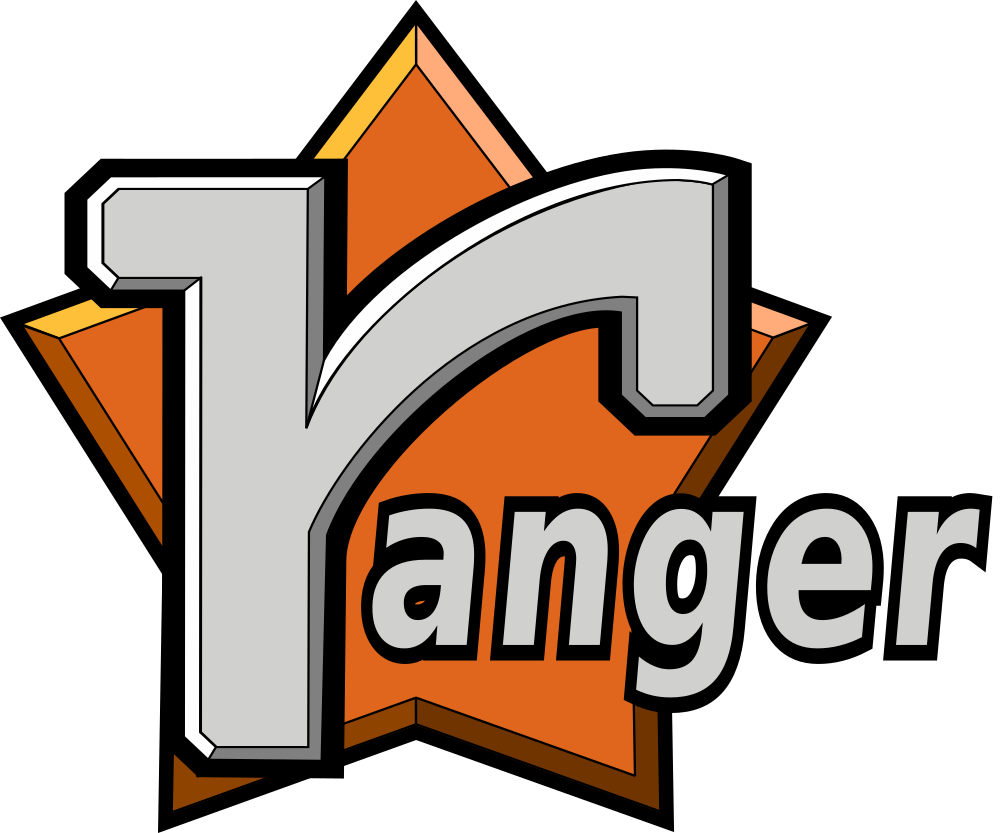

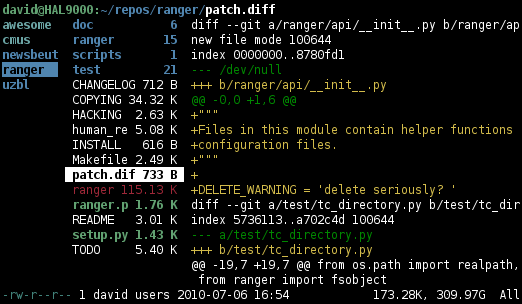
- Developers: Toon Nolten, Wojciech Siewierski, Roman Zimbelmann
- Release: June 9, 2010; 16 years ago
- Stable release: 1.9.4 / 4 November 2024
- Written in: Python
- Operating system: Linux; FreeBSD; OS X
- Size: 274 KB (tar.gz source)
- Available in: English only
- Type: File manager
- License: GPL-3.0
- Website: ranger.fm
- Repository: github.com/ranger/ranger

ranger is a free and open-source file manager with text-based user interface for Unix-like systems. It is developed by Roman Zimbelmann and licensed under the terms of the GNU General Public License. The program can accomplish file management tasks with a few keystrokes, and mouse input is optional. In conjunction with extensions including the rifle file opener and scope.sh, ranger can be scripted to open files with pre-defined programs, and to display a preview of the selected file by calling external programs.

== Features ==
- UTF-8 support
- Multi-column display (Miller columns)
- Preview of the selected file/directory
- Common file operations (create/chmod/copy/delete/...)
- VI-like console and hotkeys
- Renaming multiple files at once
- Automatically determine file types and run them with correct programs
- Integration with External Programs
- Shell directory changing after exit
- Tabs, bookmarks and mouse support
- True-color image previews
- Video thumbnails

== Design ==
ranger is written in Python and the text-based interface uses ncurses. The program makes use of the Miller columns visualization technique to display folder structures in three columns, whose default width ratios are 1:3:4. The currently active folder is always displayed in the central column, while folders higher up in the hierarchy are on the left. The rightmost column is used for displaying deeper folders and file previews.

=== Configuration ===
ranger borrows its keybindings from vi where possible, but also accepts mouse buttons and shares a few keybindings with GNU Readline and Midnight Commander. All configurable keybindings are defined in the ranger/config/rc.conf configuration file, which is located in $HOME/.config/ by default.

=== Comparison with other file managers ===
Due to its use of the Miller columns layout, ranger has been compared to Finder, the default file manager used on the classic Mac OS and macOS operating systems. It has also been suggested as a viable alternative to users accustomed to Directory Opus. ranger shares similarities with other text-based file managers including Midnight Commander, from which it borrowed its function key keyboard shortcuts, and with vifm, which also borrows features from vi and Mutt. In addition, most core utilities related to file management (cd, ls, rm, mv, ln, touch, etc.) are available from within ranger's distinct command language layer. File browser with a similar text user interface include lf, yazi and nnn.

== Reception ==
A 2012 survey among Arch Linux users found that ranger was the most used text-based file manager among respondents, surpassing Midnight Commander, the second most widely used text-based file manager, by a factor of two and a half (20% to 8%). ranger also received 0.9% of votes in the "Best File Manager" category in a 2013 survey by Linux Journal. LinuxLinks named it one of the "10 Best Orthodox Free Linux File Managers", and one of its "5 Top Console Linux File Managers". It is often cited in magazine articles and software blogs for power users as an illustration of the power and versatility of the command line interface.

== See also ==
- Midnight Commander
- List of file managers
- Comparison of file managers
