= Xfe =

Graphical file manager for Unix

Xfe File Manager
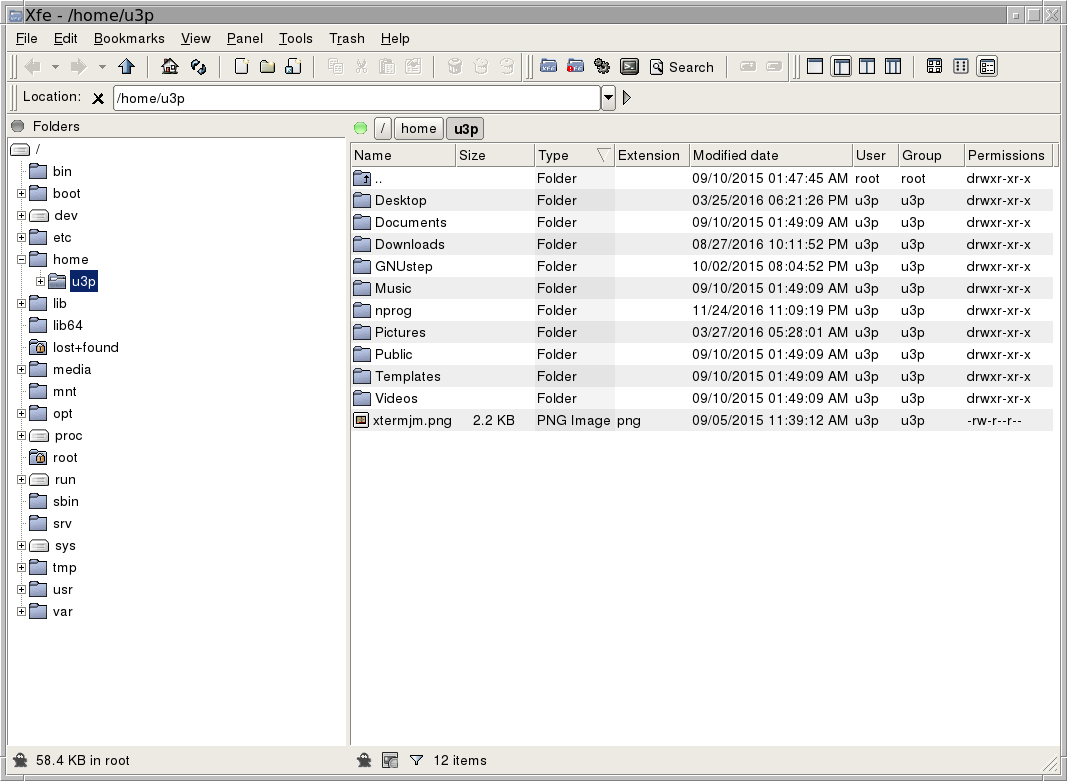
- Xfe 1.37 in Debian Linux
- Developer: Roland Baudin
- Stable release: 2.1.6 / 28 March 2026
- Written in: C++ (FOX toolkit)
- Operating system: Unix-like
- Type: File Manager
- License: GNU General Public License
- Website: roland65.free.fr/xfe/

X File Explorer (Xfe) is a graphical file manager for the X Window System for Unix and Unix-like operating systems, written by Roland Baudin. Its stated goals are simplicity, lightness and ease of use. It is written in the programming language C++ using the FOX toolkit, and licensed under the terms of the GNU General Public License.
