= Files (Google) =

File management software

- Screenshot
- Developer: Google
- Release: December 5, 2017; 8 years ago
- Stable release: 1.12735 (Build 987346843) / September 28, 2026; 10 days ago
- Operating system: Android 8+ Discontinued: Android 5, 6, 7 (2024)
- Available in: 90 languages
- Type: File manager
- Website: files.google.com

Files (formerly known as Files Go) is a file management app developed by Google for file browsing, media consumption, storage clean-up and offline file transfer. It was released by Google on December 5, 2017 with a custom version for China being released on May 30, 2018.

On August 9, 2021, the app was updated to have the Material You design, with bigger buttons and labels, and support for Android 12's Dynamic Theming.

== Features ==
The app is currently only available on the Android operating system, and includes three tabs: Clean, Browse, and Share. On Google Pixel devices, the Share tab is found by clicking the menu button.

=== Clean mode ===
This page identifies unused apps, large files, and duplicate files which users may no longer need. It can also notify the user when the storage is almost full.

There is also a "Trash" feature, in which contents will be permanently deleted after 30 days.

=== Browse mode ===
This page displays recently accessed files on the top by folder, and multiple categories on the bottom such as: "Downloads", "Images", "Videos", "Audio", "Documents & Other", and "Apps".

It also includes a "Favorites" folder, a "Safe Folder" which protects files using a Pattern or a PIN, as well as two buttons leading to "Internal storage" and "Other storage".

Alongside that, the app also has a media player/image viewer, and the ability to back up files to Google Drive.

=== Share mode ===
Files uses peer-to-peer sharing (powered by Quick Share) to send and receive files or apps. It also uses encryption to keep shared contents private.

== See also ==
- Files (Apple)
