= SpaceFM =

Graphical file manager for Linux

SpaceFM File Manager
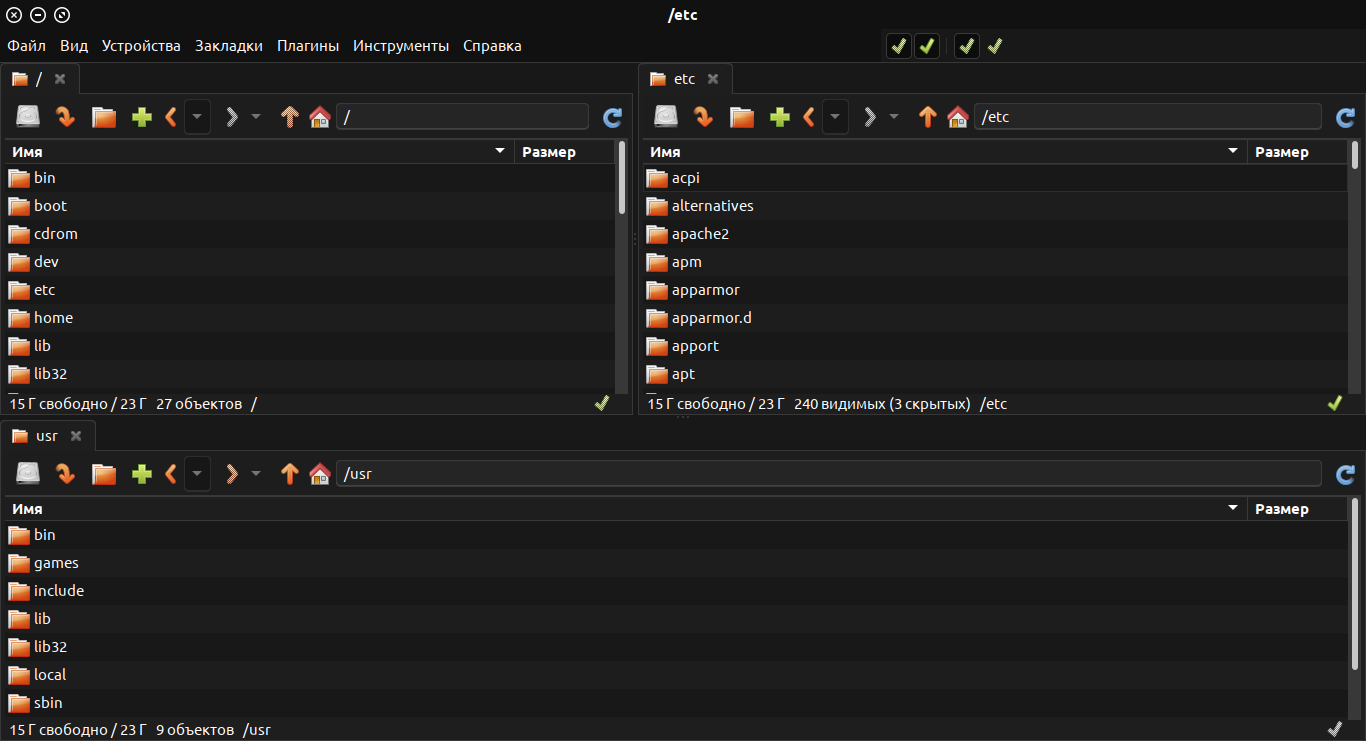
- SpaceFM
- Developer: IgnorantGuru
- Stable release: 1.0.6 / 4 March 2018; 8 years ago
- Written in: C
- Operating system: Unix-like
- License: GPLv3
- Website: ignorantguru.github.io/spacefm/
- Repository: github.com/IgnorantGuru/spacefm

SpaceFM was a desktop-independent, multi-panel, tabbed file manager for Linux. SpaceFM is built using the GTK+ toolkit. Available under the terms of the GNU General Public License, SpaceFM is free software.

== Features ==
- Panels: each window can contain up to four, independently configured panels. Each of which are in turn complete file managers with their own tabbed directory content, tool/status bars, etc.
- Tabs: each panel supports multiple folder tabs
- Configurable sidepanels: showing devices, bookmarks, directory tree.
- Configurable drag and drop and clipboard functions
- Video & image thumbnails
- Search with support for IEEE Pattern Matching Notation
- Bash integration (with in app tab completion)
- Task Manager & Queue: ability background long running tasks and continue working
- Built-in VFS, udev- or HAL-based device manager
- Network support: mount nfs, ftp, smb, ssh and iso
- Customizable menu system
- Lightweight desktop management capabilities (icons, wallpaper)
- Path bar with breadcrumb navigation

== History ==
SpaceFM was originally developed from a fork of the legacy PCMan File Manager and later PCManFM-Mod. The internal virtual filesystem (VFS), was retained and extended.

Due to the extensive changes in many parts of the project, SpaceFM was released with its new name as an alpha test version in January 2012.

In version 0.7.5, April 2012, SpaceFM replaced udisks with direct udev support for device detection and information. It also supported multiple mount solutions including udevil (a mount program developed specifically for SpaceFM), pmount, udisks v1 or v2, or any program. This update also allowed for support of network filesystems.

In October 2012, the GTK3 version of SpaceFM was introduced, which supports GTK2 or GTK3.

Subsequent improvements include extending the features of SpaceFM's Desktop Manager, a new Menu Item Properties dialog for adding and customizing menu items, socket commands for interacting with a running instance, and an improved panel configuration memory.

While SpaceFM was still under development, the developers hosted a community-maintained wiki on GitHub, the latter of which also served as a repository for user-contributed plugins. Community support was also facilitated through SourceForge and an official IRC channel.

As of December 2022, SpaceFM is unmaintained software, with more than 200 open issues.

== Reception ==
Shashank Sharma of Linux Format gave SpaceFM three out of five stars in a roundup of several file managers for Linux. He concluded that it was "well-designed and highly configurable tool" but that it could use more features. He called the search function "flaky and unpredictable", as was the function to send files as email attachments. Sharma praised its robust support for plugins, writing that "Creating plugins for SpaceFM is quite easy and the entire process is discussed at length in the official documentation". Rene Millman of IT Pro called it one of the top five best file managers for Linux in 2021. Seth Kenlon of Opensource.com called SpaceFM lightweight but highly versatile and complex and recommended new users spend time experimenting with the software to understand its complexities.
