= GNOME Commander =

Twin-panel file manager for the GNOME desktop

Gnome Commander
- Developer: The Gnome Commander team
- Stable release: 2.0.0 / 17 May 2026
- Written in: Rust since v2.0.0, C++ up to v1.18.6
- Operating system: Linux, BSD, Unix-like, Windows (via Cygwin)
- Platform: GTK4
- Available in: 40 languages
- Type: File manager
- License: GPL-3.0-or-later
- Website: gitlab.gnome.org/GNOME/gnome-commander
- Repository: gitlab.gnome.org/GNOME/gnome-commander.git

Gnome Commander is an orthodox file manager for Linux. It is built using the GTK+ toolkit and GVfs.

== Features ==
- GNOME MIME types
- Network support through FTP, SFTP, SAMBA and WebDAV
- User defined context menu
- Integrated command line and embedded terminal
- Latest accessed folder history
- Folder bookmarks
- Plugin support
- Fast internal file viewer for text and images
- Metadata support for Exif, IPTC, ID3, Vorbis, FLAC, APE, PDF, OLE2 and ODF tags
- Advanced rename tool for files
- Searching and quick file search in current directory, symlinking, comparing directories
- User defined keyboard shortcuts

== User interface ==
The Gnome Commander is one of the file managers with two separate panels, based on the split-view interface of Norton Commander. This allows the simultaneous view of a source and destination directory for copying and moving files or directories. This also makes comparing directories very convenient. The number of windows on the desktop is thereby reduced. In Gnome Commander the two panels can be arranged either horizontally or vertically.

The Gnome Commander is seamlessly integrated into the GNOME desktop environment and can therefore serve as an alternative to the default file manager Nautilus which offers a so-called spatial view, where the content of each directory is displayed in a new window.

Only the keyboard is required to work with Gnome Commander, which makes working processes much faster. Using the mouse is still an option. Keyboard shortcuts and the behavior of certain mouse buttons are freely configurable.

Since Gnome Commander supports GVfs, allowing access to network interfaces such as FTP, SMB, WebDAV and SSH. There is a bookmark system for folders and a built-in file viewer for text and image documents. An integrated command line enables commands directly as input to a terminal.

The integrated Archive Manager plugin supports numerous data compression file formats such as ZIP files. Furthermore, a support for metadata systems such as Exif, IPTC and ID3-Tags for audio and video files, and other documents (e.g. pdf) is integrated. This metadata can be used for example by means of an extended tool for renaming files. It is possible to define actions depending on certain file extensions and to start these actions via a pop-up menu by right-clicking on the file.

== See also ==
- Comparison of file managers
