= Xfm (file manager) =

X11 file manager

- Developers: Simon Marlow, Albert Gräf, Till Straumann and others
- Final release: 1.4.3 / 3 September 2001
- License: GPL-2.0-or-later
- Website: www.musikinformatik.uni-mainz.de/ag/xfm/xfm.html

Xfm (X File Manager) is a graphical file manager for the X Window System.

The xfm file manager is written with classic Athena Widgets included with X11 distribution and it uses only the following X11 libraries:

- libx11 X11 client-side library
- libxmu6 X11 miscellaneous utility library
- X PixMap library
- X Toolkit Intrinsics library
- Xaw3d (Athena) widget set

Xfm was very popular in 1990s, when it won the title of "Favorite File Manager" in the Linux Journal 1997 Readers' Choice Awards and finished 2nd in 1998.
