= Spatial file manager =

Concept in computing

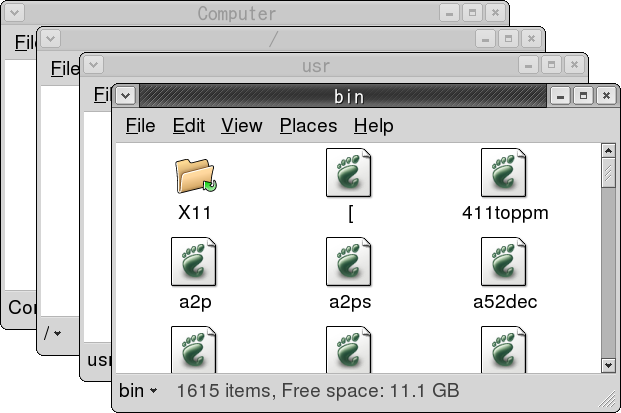
Nautilus (in older versions) is a file manager with a spatial mode. Each of these windows is an open folder.

In computing, a spatial file manager is a file manager that uses a spatial metaphor to represent files and folders as if they were real physical objects.

== Concepts ==
The base requirements of a spatial file manager are:

1. Each folder is represented by a single window.
2. Each window is unambiguously and irrevocably tied to a particular folder.
3. Stability: files, folders, and windows go where the user moves them, stay where the user puts them ("preserve their spatial state"), and retain all their other "physical" characteristics (like size, shape, color and location).
4. The same item can only be viewed in one window at a time.

Given an arbitrary window in a spatial file manager, it must be possible to determine with complete certainty which folder that window represents. Furthermore, it must not be possible to change that association.

Traditionally, when a folder is opened, the icon representing the folder changes —perhaps from an image showing a closed drawer to an opened one, perhaps the folder's icon turns into a silhouette filled with a pattern— and a new window is opened. Attempting to open that "already opened" folder will simply reveal the existing window. A new window will not be created because that would violate requirement number one listed above, attempting to reveal an already opened folder's contents using another window will either close the existing folder before opening it or refuse to reveal said contents. The change in the folder icon's state is meant to be a visual reminder of this behavior. It says, "This folder is already open." Similarly, while a document or application is open, its icons also represents this status and re-opening it will just reveal and bring it back to the front.

A common alternative to the spatial file manager is the navigational file manager or "browser-style" file manager. A window in such a system is a device through which the contents of many folders may be viewed. A browser-style window is not tied to any particular folder. The window's spatial state (size, position, etc.) stays the same as the contents of many different folders are viewed through it. More than one browser window may show the contents of a particular folder simultaneously.

== Examples ==
Examples of file managers that use a spatial metaphor by default include:

- Amiga's Workbench
- Apple's Finder 5 to 9 (versions prior to Mac OS X)
- BeOS's Tracker
- Enlightenment 17's file manager
- GNOME's Nautilus from version 2.6 till 2.28
- the OS/2 Workplace Shell
- the RISC OS Filer
- the ROX Desktop's ROX-Filer
- Windows Explorer in Windows 95 was also a spatial file manager in some aspects, but became a navigational file manager in later versions of the operating system (when using the default settings)

MATE's Caja file manager has a spatial mode, but is navigational by default.

== Other objects ==
Some file managers represent other objects, such as a trash can for unwanted files, or computer or floppy disk icons to represent storage media. There may also be special folders that contain special items such as user preferences or the user's applications.

== Advantages and disadvantages ==
=== Advantages ===
A spatial file manager is closer to the way people interact with physical objects around them, such as desks, chairs and tables. Since spatial properties are reliable indicators of "location" in a spatial file manager, the user may build up a familiar work environment by arranging commonly used windows, secure in the knowledge that this state will be preserved and will always map to the expected locations. This familiarity can lead to increased comfort and efficiency.

Furthermore, identification based on spatial attributes is a very natural human ability, requiring little or no conscious thought. The ability to recognize and recall locations within the hierarchy based on the appearance and position of folder windows is the primary purpose of the spatial file manager. All of the "rules" and behaviors that define the spatial file manager are designed to ensure that the strengths of the visual/spatial recognition and recall abilities of the human brain are leveraged. The idea is that these abilities are more natural and require "less work" than other forms of recognition based on reading text, maintaining an awareness of "current working directory" (in a command-line environment, for example), relying on the memory of past actions, or any other non-spatial cues.

One more advantage is that it allows the user to keep things arranged a certain way from one session to the next, as with the "workspace" settings in many high-end software packages. For instance, the windows showing the contents of different folders for a complex project could be tiled onscreen in such a fashion that all of them could be seen at the same time. In a browser-style file manager, one would be forced to rearrange these same windows every time they were reopened.

=== Disadvantages ===
The spatial metaphor can seem awkward to those accustomed to browser-style file managers. One complaint is that spatial managers use too many windows, leading to clutter. In a Windows 95 usability study by Microsoft, users of varying experience were said to be "confused" by the many windows:

Users of every type were confused by the Programs folder. We thought that having a folder on the desktop with other folders and links to programs inside it would be a natural transition for Windows 3.1 users accustomed to Program Manager, while being relatively easy to learn for beginners. We were wrong! Beginners quickly got lost in all of the folders (unlike File Cabinet, each folder opened into a different window) and other users had a lot of trouble deciding whether they were looking at the actual file system and its files or just links to actual files.

Proponents claim that this confusion is partially a result of the non-spatial nature of the Windows 95 file manager. When the connection between the spatial state of a window is not unambiguously and irrevocably connected with a particular folder, it becomes impossible reliably to recognize a particular folder based on its spatial qualities. Spatial state often becomes misleading in a non-spatial file manager. Users may incorrectly identify a window based on visual cues that do not actually link it to any particular folder, but are instead properties of the browser-style window itself. In such an environment, each new window adds clutter without recognizable meaning. This leads to the often-cited preference for a single window through which any folder may be viewed: a browser. The proliferation and familiarity of web browsers has strengthened this preference.

Also, maintaining spatial familiarity can be difficult when the file system is accessed from a variety of applications and devices with differing display capabilities. Reproducing a single spatial arrangement on many different display devices is sometimes impractical. Per-device, per-user, or per-display spatial state is one possible solution, at the cost of an increased amount of state information that must be stored.

== See also ==
- File manager
- Desktop metaphor
- Navigational file manager
- Spatial navigation
