= ZTreeWin =

Orthodox file manager for Microsoft Windows

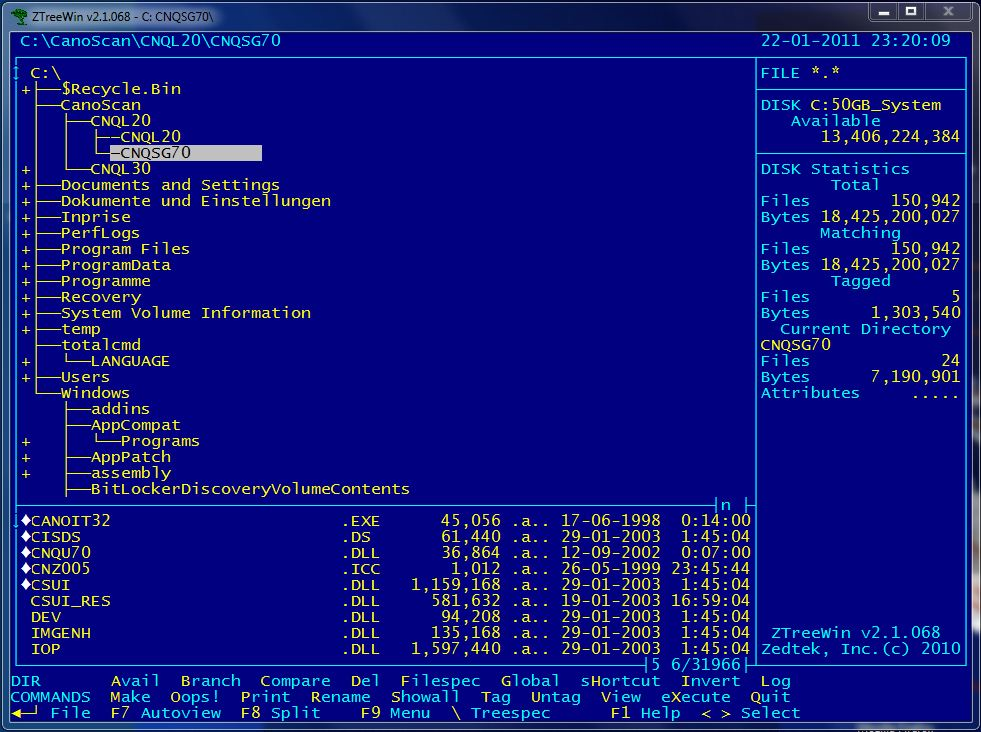
- ZTreeWin 2.1
- Original author: Kim Henkel
- Developer: Zedtek Inc.
- Stable release: 2.2 / March 1, 2011; 15 years ago
- Preview release: 2.9.12 / November 12, 2026; 9 days ago
- Operating system: Windows
- Available in: English
- Type: File manager
- License: Proprietary
- Website: www.ztree.com

ZTreeWin is a text-based navigational file manager for Windows. It is based on XTree with additional improvements such as supporting long filenames.

Like XTree, it displays information about files and folders. These are loaded into memory so that search and sort operations are extremely fast. By making use of the large memories of modern computers it allows the display and searching of millions of files.

ZTreeWin runs in a text-based Win32 console window. It is primarily key-driven, but also supports the use of the mouse.

The ZAAP architecture is available which supports the integration of add-in applications.

== Background ==
XTree was a popular file manager with a text-based user interface released in 1985 for MS-DOS. ZTreeWin is heavily based on XTree and XTree Gold, providing a similar user interface and hot keys for Windows.

== Development ==
Kim Henkel used a 16-bit version of XTree Gold in OS/2 but found that it did not support CD-ROMs. He contacted the software vendor and requested it to be enhanced to support CDs and also port it to 32-bit to increase the current memory limit of 640 KB. After his request was declined, he then offered to port the software for US$25,000, which was also declined.

After this rejection Henkel created a prototype for ZTree Bold that ran under OS/2. The initial prototype was created in two or three weeks and was written in C. He then sold it as shareware under the name ZTree Bold. This was sold at a time when Symantec was still selling XTree Gold. He later ported the ZTree Bold to Windows and named the new product ZTreeWin.

Sales significanly increased after a positive article by John C. Dvorak was published in the September 22, 1998, issue of PC Magazine. Dvorak also arranged for Symantec to agree to allow Henkel legal rights to use XTree's look and feel.

There was a popular forum, The ZTreeWin Forum, that had about 200 members, that provided technical support. It was managed by Victor Garcia from Mexico City. In June/July 2024 the forum disappeared from the Internet. Nobody has been able to contact Victor Garcia since then.

== Historical significance and reception ==
ZTreeWin is historically significant as it allows users to run an approximation of XTree which was one of the most popular file managers from the MS-DOS era. This allows users to experience what the 1985 XTree was like, while doing so on a modern version of Windows.

John C. Dvorak stated in an article in the September 22, 1998, issue of PC Magazine that he had "long lamented the death of XTree" until he discovered ZTree. He wrote that "[t]here has never been anything close to it for ease of use and versatilty" and concluded that "ZTree's as good as it gets". Jeff Holtzman of Electronics Now wrote that it was useful as an "emergency toolkit disk" on account of its small disk footprint allowing it to fit on a single floppy disk. David Drucker of Computer Buyer's Guide and Handbook, writing in May 1998, called it a "a stable and useful program that's also a work in progress ... provid[ing] nearly all of the much-loved features of its predecessor". Edward Mendelson, writing in PC Magazine in 2015, gave it a four out of five star review and complimented its speed.

Around 2001, ZTree was downloaded between 5000 and 8000 times each month from the ZTree website.

== Features ==
- Complete keyboard support (as well as mouse)
- Tree and/or file views
- Split screen (dual-pane) option
- Find-as-you-type search
- File name search
- File content search (hex, Unicode, text)
- File viewer with multiple view modes (hex, text, dump)
- Set, adjust or increment timestamps (camera co-ordination)
- Duplicate file detection
- Branch (or 'flat') file view - see all files in an entire directory and subdirectories in one view
- Global files view - see all files (or tagged files) on every logged drive
- Tagged files (session-long selection, e.g. once tagged (selected), a file remains tagged until explicitly untagged)
- Batch file creation using tagged filenames with parameters
- Displays size or number of files of each folder or branch (total of all folders below it)
- Powerful and flexible renaming of (multiple) files and/or folders w/search & replace & numeric increment capabilities.
- File comparison
- Directory & Branch comparisons
- User-definable scriptable menu
- Integrated support for .ZIP and .RAR archive files
- Extensible support for many other archive files
- Can be run from floppy disk or USB flash drive without installation
- Session save & resume
- Ability to NOT log (skip) certain directories that you never want to see with wildcard abilities (can override)

== See also ==
- Comparison of file managers
