= Thunar =

File manager

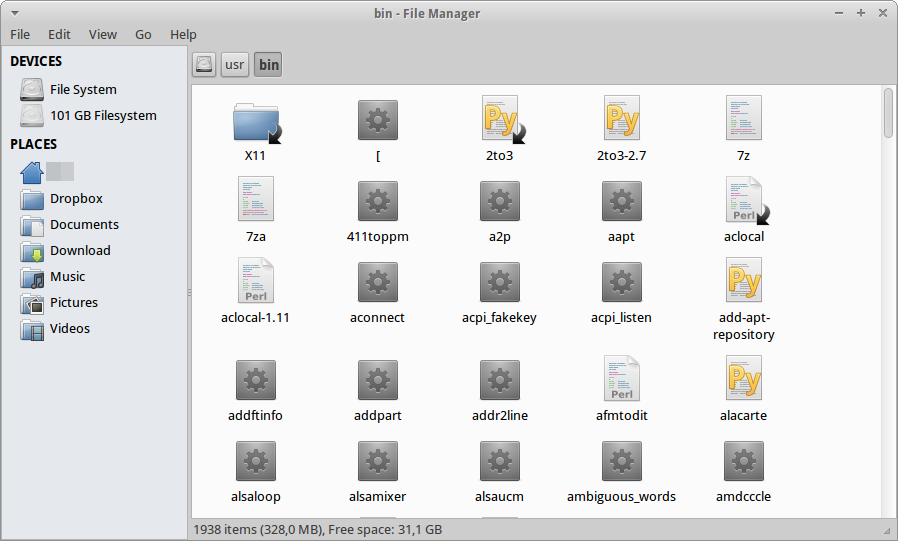
- Thunar 1.6.2 screenshot
- Developers: Xfce and Benedikt Meurer
- Stable release: 4.20.8 / 28 March 2026; 5 months ago
- Operating system: Unix-like
- Type: File manager
- License: GPL-2.0-or-later
- Website: docs.xfce.org/xfce/thunar/start
- Repository: gitlab.xfce.org/xfce/thunar

Thunar is a file manager for Linux and other Unix-like systems, initially written using the GTK+ 2 toolkit and later ported to the GTK+ 3 toolkit. It started to ship with Xfce in version 4.4 RC1 and later. Thunar is developed by Benedikt Meurer, and was originally intended to replace XFFM, Xfce's previous file manager. It was initially called Filer but was changed to Thunar due to a name clash.

Thunar is designed to start up faster and be more responsive than some other Linux file managers, such as GNOME Files and Konqueror. Accessibility is accomplished using GNOME Accessibility Toolkit. Like the rest of Xfce, Thunar is designed to comply with standards, such as those stated at freedesktop.org. Thunar is simple and lightweight by design, but its functionality can be extended through various plugins.

Thunar is named after the Old Saxon name of Thor, the god of thunder in Norse mythology, and uses Mjölnir, Thor's hammer, as its icon.

== Interface ==
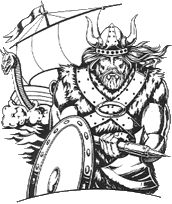
Thunar's About screen logo

The Thunar interface was developed prior to the coding of its core. A minimally functional software mockup was built in Python. Features were added and UI elements changed iteratively to react to test user input.

== Features ==
Thunar ships with a plugin that provides bulk renaming capabilities. The Bulk Renamer window can also be used independently of the Thunar application.

Another feature that expands on Thunar's builtin functions is the ability to create Custom Actions. These are user-configurable items such as scripts or external programs, that can be called from within Thunar, for instance to perform certain tasks on the selected files or directories.

== API ==
Thunar provides an API for third-party developers:

- The "thunar-vfs" is a cross-platform API for high-level file system operations. This is deprecated for the 1.2.0 release in favor of the native GVfs.
- The "thunarx" is a library for building extensions to the file manager itself.
- Lacking is an API to resolve folder symbolic links properly to "open the parent folder", not the symbolic link's folder.

Thunar can also be extended by writing scripts to be placed in the context menu for various file types.
