= Pocket PC (disambiguation) =

Pocket PC is a class of personal digital assistant (PDA) defined by Microsoft.

Pocket PC may also refer to:

- Pocket computer, class of handheld computer popular in the early 1980s
- DIP Pocket PC, handheld PC licensed to Atari and resold as the Atari Portfolio in 1989
- Poqet PC, handheld PC released in 1989
- Zeos Pocket PC, handheld PC released in 1992

== See also ==
- Handheld PC
