= Smartphone & Pocket PC =

Magazine

Smartphone & Pocket PC was a magazine published every two months by Thaddeus Computing and covered Windows Mobile devices, software, and accessories. It included news, tips, articles, reviews, how-tos, and an enterprise section. Its headquarters was in Fairfield, Iowa.

== History ==
The publishing company Thaddeus Computing, formerly called Personalized Software, was founded in 1985. The company's initial publication, The Portable Paper, was a newsletter covering the HP Portable (aka HP 110) and HP Portable Plus (aka HP 110 Plus). When that line of computers was discontinued in 1991, Thaddeus Computing launched a newsletter related to Hewlett-Packard's series of Palmtop PCs including the HP 95LX, HP 100LX, HP 200LX etc. called The HP Palmtop Paper. It was discontinued in 1999 following the demise of the HP Palmtops.

As the market moved towards PDAs, in 1997 Thaddeus Computing launched Handheld PC Magazine, the company's first glossy magazine. It covered the Handheld PC devices based on Microsoft's new Windows CE software. In 2000, with Microsoft's launch of the Pocket PC hardware specification and software suite, the name was changed to Pocket PC. As Microsoft phased out the use of the Pocket PC nomenclature in lieu of Windows Mobile in 2007, the name of the magazine was changed to Smartphone & Pocket PC magazine.

As editorial coverage of technology shifts away from print publications and to the Internet, Smartphone & Pocket PC expanded its online offerings, which included complete archives of past issues, a product encyclopedia, and expert blogs. The magazine ceased publication in 2008.

Thaddeus Computing also published iPhone Life.

== Contributors ==
Most of the writers for the magazine and the web site were enthusiasts in various professions rather than staff writers.
