= HP 95LX =

1991 personal digital assistant from Hewlett Packard

Hewlett-Packard 95LX
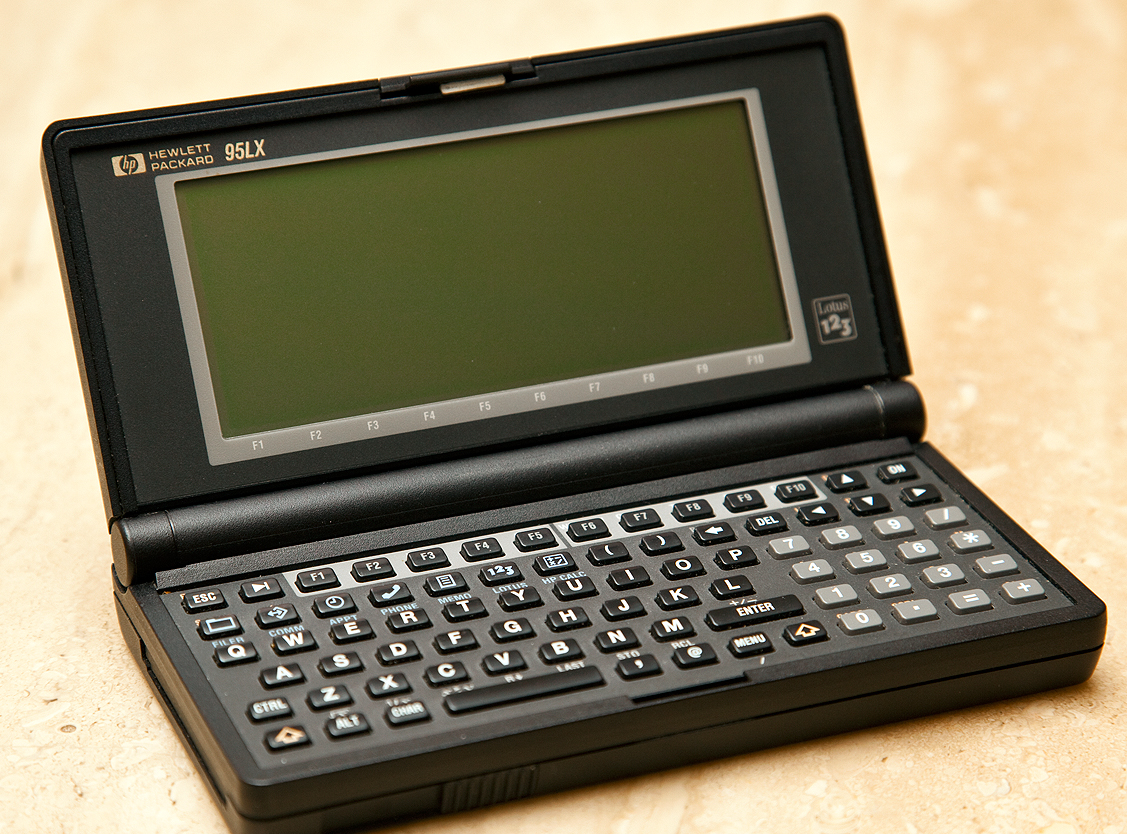
- Like most pocket computers, the HP 95LX owner's manual is larger and heavier than the computer itself.
- Also known as: Jaguar
- Manufacturer: Hewlett-Packard
- Type: Palmtop PC
- Released: April 1991; 35 years ago
- Introductory price: US$550 (equivalent to $1,300 in 2025)
- Discontinued: 1 January 2003
- Units shipped: 400,000 (estimated production run)
- Operating system: MS-DOS 3.22
- CPU: NEC V20 @ 5.37 MHz
- Memory: 512 KB (F1000A) or 1 MB (F1010A)
- Removable storage: SRAM card (0.5 MB – 32 MB)
- Display: 40 × 16 characters LCD screen (4.8 inch × 1.8 inch)
- Graphics: 240 × 128 pixels (quarter-CGA resolution) monochrome STN, 2 scales
- Sound: PC speaker (piezo)
- Input: Thumb keyboard with 80 keys and a dedicated numeric keypad
- Connectivity: RS-232-compatible serial port, infrared port, PCMCIA 1.0 type II (3.3 mm or 5 mm)
- Power: 2× AA-size removable batteries, 1× CR2032 coin cell backup, optional AC adapter
- Dimensions: Length 8.5 cm, width 15.9 cm, height 2.6 cm (3.4 inches × 6.3 inches × 1 inch)
- Weight: 312 g (11 ounces)
- Backward compatibility: Intel 8088
- Successor: HP 100LX

The HP 95LX Palmtop PC (F1000A, F1010A), also known as project Jaguar, is Hewlett Packard's first DOS-based pocket computer, or personal digital assistant, introduced in April 1991 in collaboration with Lotus Development Corporation. The abbreviation "LX" stood for "Lotus Expandable". The computer can be seen as successor to a series of larger portable PCs like the HP 110 and HP 110 Plus.

== Hardware ==
HP 95LX has an Intel 8088-clone NEC V20 CPU running at 5.37 MHz with an Intel system on a chip (SoC) device. It cannot be considered completely PC-compatible because of its quarter-CGA (MDA)-resolution LCD screen.

The device includes a CR2032 lithium coin cell for memory backup when the two AA main batteries run out. For mass storage, HP 95LX has a single PCMCIA slot which can hold a static RAM card with its own CR2025 back-up coin cell. An RS-232-compatible serial port is provided, as well as an infrared port for printing on compatible models of Hewlett Packard printers.

=== Display ===
In character mode, the display shows 16 lines of 40 characters, and has no backlight. While most IBM-compatible PCs work with a hardware code page 437, HP 95LX's text mode font is hard-wired to code page 850 instead. Lotus 1-2-3 internally used the Lotus International Character Set (LICS), but characters are translated to code page 850 for display and printing purposes.

== Software ==
The palmtop runs MS-DOS 3.22 and has a customized version of Lotus 1-2-3 Release 2.2 built in. Other software in read-only memory (ROM) includes a calculator, an appointment calendar, a telecommunications program, and a simple text editor. Two built in games are also included on English-language versions of the HP 95LX - TigerFox and Hearts&Bones, which can only be started while in DOS mode.

== Successors ==
Successor models to HP 95LX include HP 100LX, HP Palmtop FX, HP 200LX, HP 1000CX, and HP OmniGo 700LX.

== See also ==
- DIP Pocket PC
- Atari Portfolio
- Poqet PC
- Poqet PC Prime
- Poqet PC Plus
- Sharp PC-3000
- ZEOS Pocket PC
- Yukyung Viliv N5
- Sub-notebook
- Netbook
- Palmtop PC
- Ultra-mobile PC
