= Zeos =

Defunct computer company

Zeos International, Ltd.
- Type: Defunct
- Industry: Computer hardware
- Founded: 1981
- Defunct: 1995
- Headquarters: Minneapolis, Minnesota, U.S.
- Key people: Gregory E. Herrick, Founder and CEO
- Products: Desktops; Notebooks; Peripherals

Zeos International, Ltd. (stylized as ZEŌS), was a PC manufacturer based in Minneapolis, Minnesota. Originally based in New Brighton, Minnesota, and founded by Gregory E. Herrick, the company incorporated in Minnesota in 1981. Prior to manufacturing PCs, the company was called NPC Electronics. NPC was a contract assembly business best known for developing a transmitter device called Radio Realty. Marketed primarily to real estate brokers, this product enabled prospective home buyers to tune in and listen to prerecorded information about a property listing while parked in front of the dwelling. Radio Realty was divested in the early 1980s as NPC started developing, manufacturing, and selling PCs under the Zeos name. The company went public in mid-1985 by self-underwriting, and officially changed its name from NPC Electronics to Zeos International.

== History ==
The company's first PC related product was the PC Speeder, a device designed to increase the clock speed (and thereby the performance) of the 8086 processor. The company then began work engineering a motherboard to retrofit the soon-to-be-introduced Intel 386 processor on their existing 286 platform.

The company sold its first PC in November 1987 with its first ad in Computer Shopper. Rapid sales and growth led Zeos to become Fortune's fastest growing public company in America in 1991. Zeos marketed its products primarily through mail order, but also partnered with and distributed PCs to Sam's Club stores. Zeos also had two retail outlet stores, located in Arden Hills and Golden Valley, Minnesota, where refurbished and customer-returned hardware was resold, often at substantial discounts.

The company went public in mid-1985 by self-underwriting, and officially changed its name from NPC Electronics to ZEOS International. Traded on the NASDAQ under the symbol "ZEOS, the company enjoyed rapid sales and growth leading ZEOS to become Fortune’s fastest growing public company in America in 1991.

Following a tradition set earlier by CP/M manufacturers like Kaypro and Morrow Designs, Zeos bundled Lotus 1-2-3 and Ami Pro with its systems while many competitors still included only operating system software, requiring customers to purchase applications separately and elsewhere. This move eventually forced Zeos' rivals such as Dell and Gateway 2000 to also bundle software with their systems.

In March 1992, Zeos acquired PC Tech, Inc., a Lake City, Minnesota–based ODM whom Zeos had earlier contracted to design Zeos' expansion cards and motherboards. This acquisition allowed Zeos to increase its vertical integration in the manufacturing of its computers.

During the peak of its desktop business, Zeos sold 386- and 486-based systems under the Zeos and Discovery brand names. In the mid-1990s, it sold Pentium-based desktops, branded Pantera, and laptops, branded Freestyle, Meridian, and ColorNote.

Zeos also was successful in the laptop category, introducing three 486SX based laptops before rival Dell came out with their first. The company also marketed subnotebooks branded Contenda (both 386SL-, 486SL-based) and Zeos Pocket PC (8086-compatible palmtop, using the NEC V30 processor).

The Zeos 386SX was once featured on the cover of PC Magazine, rated as Editor's Choice in its January 30, 1990, issue.

Late generation Zeos motherboards models were code-named with a zoological theme. Motherboards based on early 486 designs went by classes of birds such as Duck, Goose, Gosling, and Martin. Later 486 and Pentium motherboards used families of serpents (i.e. snakes), such as Rattler, Python, Cobra, Coral, and Boa.

== Industry firsts ==
Among other notable firsts, Zeos was the first computer company to offer 24/7 toll-free technical support.

The company was also first to capitalize on e-commerce and in 1990, Zeos was the first marketer to use banner ads in online marketing. Subscribers of the Prodigy online service could browse and order Zeos PCs long before the World Wide Web had any significant presence.

In later years, the company was first to market pre-configured, ready-to-ship PCs under a campaign called "Computers Now", promising nationwide delivery in under 24 hours. This initiative was successfully achieved through direct marketing.

== Merger with Micron Technologies ==
In 1996, Zeos acquired Micron Computer, Inc., and Micron Custom Manufacturing Services, Inc., two business units of Boise-based Micron Technologies. The reverse takeover resulted in Micron Technologies taking a controlling interest in Zeos. The Zeos brand was quickly phased out, and the combined company known as Micron Electronics Inc. began trading under the symbol MUEI. The company was sold twice after the original Zeos/Micron transaction, with the final iteration, MPC Corporation, ceasing business operations December 31, 2008.

== Zeos Pocket PC (PPC) ==
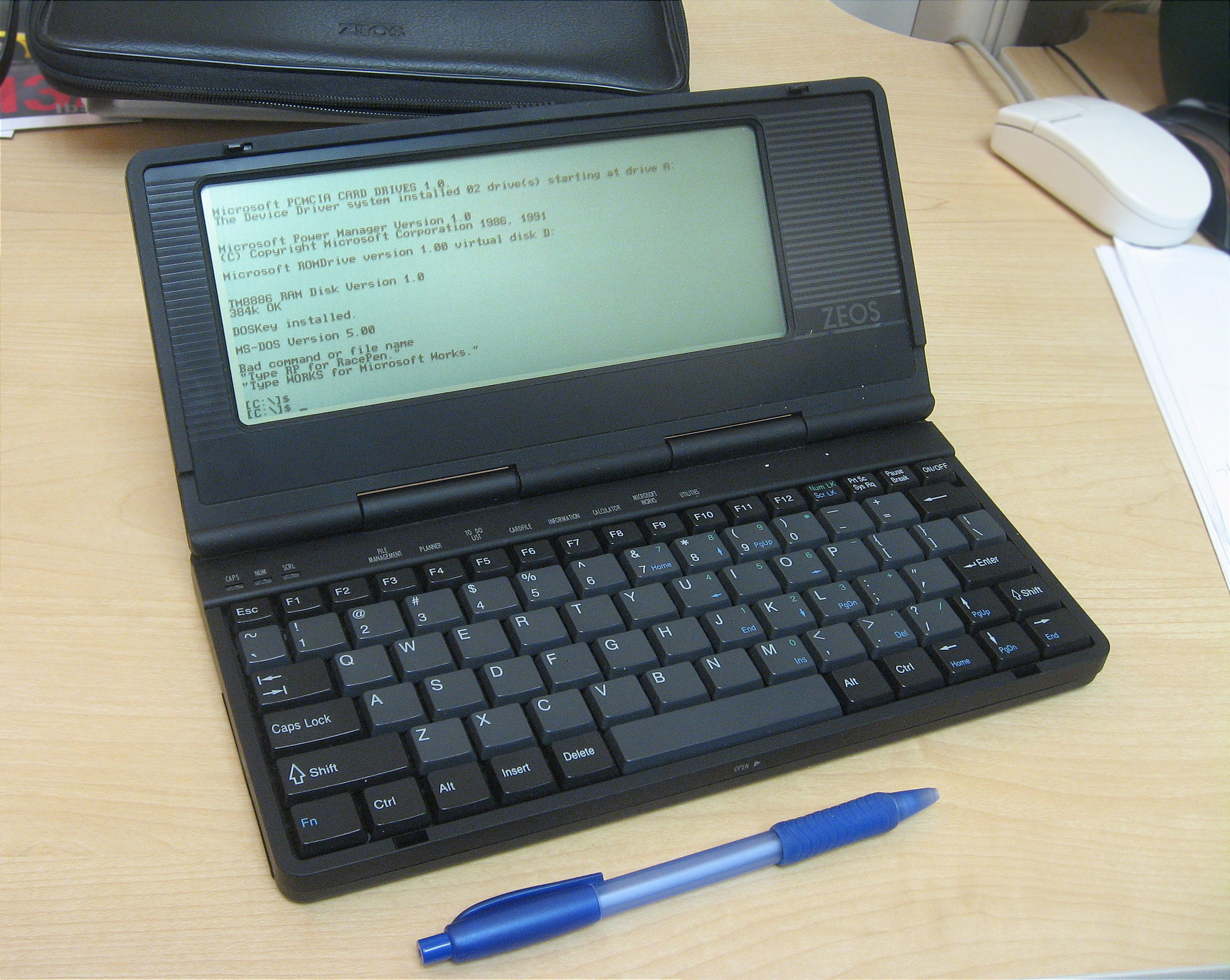
Zeos Pocket PC

Manufactured around 1991–1992 and selling for $595, the Zeos Pocket PC was a palmtop which ran MS-DOS 5.0 and was broadly similar in form and function to the Poqet PC. The device was also available as Tidalwave PS-1000, Vobis Highscreen Handy Organizer, and Peacock Palmtop PC in other countries. It was bundled with Microsoft Works and RacePen. Its dimensions were 4.5" × 9.7" × 1.0" and it weighed approximately 1.3 lb (0.59 kg). The 640x200 monochrome LCD screen was about 2.75" × 7" and was not backlit. The keyboard was 9" wide (compared to 11" for a standard keyboard), making typing slightly tedious for many people. The unit featured two PCMCIA card slots, as well as a serial and a parallel port located on the rear which used proprietary mini-connectors and custom cables, which were included with the unit. The unit powered on instantly using two standard AA batteries and one lithium backup battery. It was manufactured in Taiwan and sold by mail-order.
