= SaferSurf =

Software product

- Initial release: 2003
- Operating system: Cross-platform
- Available in: English and German
- Type: Browser security
- License: Commercial
- Website: www.safersurf.com

SaferSurf is a software product for anonymous internet surfing developed by Nutzwerk, a German software company.

== Reception ==
When SaferSurf was released in 2003, the media praised its speed. Hamburger Abendblatt wrote: "Surf up to ten times faster, virus-free: that is the service offered by the company Nutzwerk. (...) Even with a slow modem connection, the data reaches its goal faster (...)" Pocket PC magazine wrote: "Indeed, with the assistance of SaferSurf Speed web pages display up to three times faster (...) SaferSurf Speed works independently from any ISP and internet connection (standard modem, ISDN, DSL, mobile communications, LAN, etc.) you use."

Other media gave more weight to anonymity and protection. The Bild's computer magazine tested several web anonymity programs and cited "reliable anonymization" among the advantages of SaferSurf. In the same year, Macworld praised its spam-filtering service.
