= System manager =

System manager or System Manager may refer to:

- Datapac System Manager, a derivative of Multiuser DOS, originally by Digital Research and Novell, in the 1990s
- System Manager (HP LX), a DOS-based graphical user interface on the Hewlett-Packard LX series of palmtop PCs
- IBM Flex System Manager, a component of the PureSystems line of server products in the 2010s
- IBM Web-based System Manager, a management software for AIX 5L host administration on RS/6000 systems
- System administrator, a practitioner of IT administration
