= System Manager (HP LX) =

HP LX System Manager
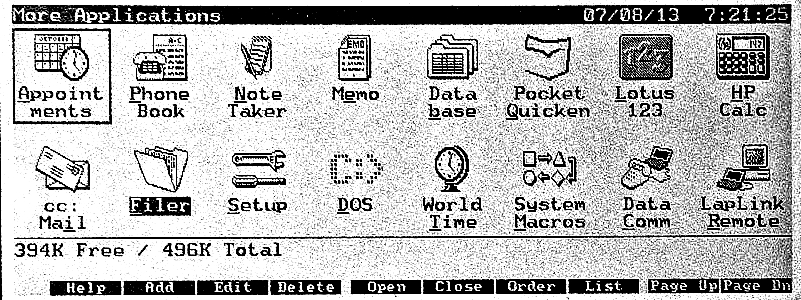
- The Application Manager for the HP LX series
- Developer(s): Hewlett-Packard
- Operating system: DOS
- Platform: HP LX-series Palmtop computers
- Type: GUI
- License: Commercial proprietary software

The HP LX System Manager is the application manager and GUI for HP LX-series Palmtop computers.

== Overview ==
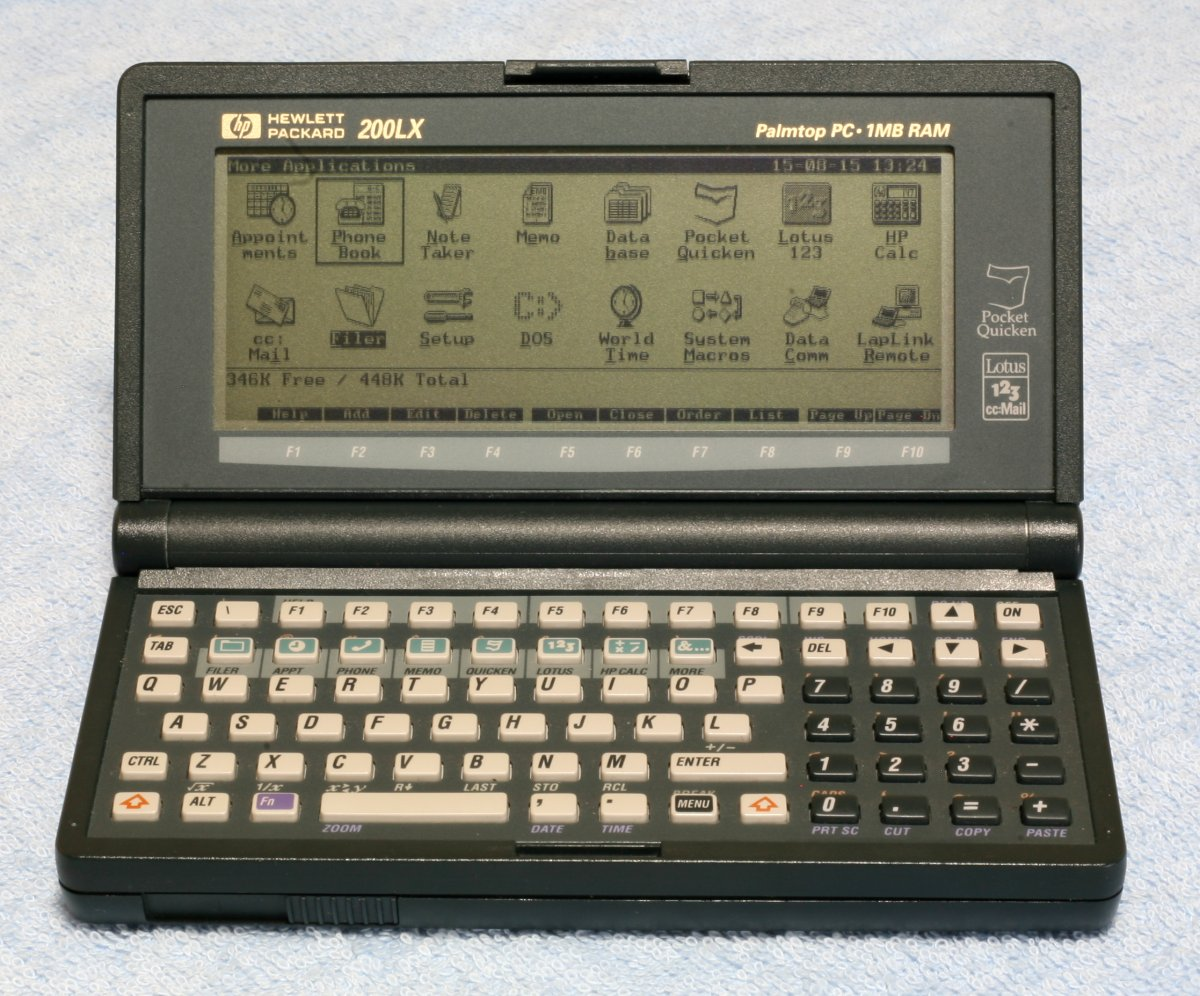
HP LX System Manager running on a HP 200LX.

The App Manager page is made up of 2 rows of 8 icons, with an additional shorter row on the next page down by default. (More applications can be added as the user wishes.) The menu bar options that are available can be opened (on a HP 200LX) by using the Menu key or the Alt key. These include task management, booting out of the GUI into DOS and opening help for the palmtop.

== Flaws ==
One of the major flaws in the System Manager is its limited icon space in Application Manager. You can put only 32 icons there. You can delete some default icons to get space but some are undeletable. Another item of interest that some people have referred to as a flaw is that the HEXCALC built-in application is missing from the System Manager by default. To add the program to the list, it is necessary to manually add an entry with the following fields:

Name: He&x Calc
Path: D:\BIN\HEXCALC.EXM.

== See also ==
- HP 200LX
