= HP 200LX =

Personal digital assistant manufactured by Hewlett-Packard

Hewlett-Packard 200LX
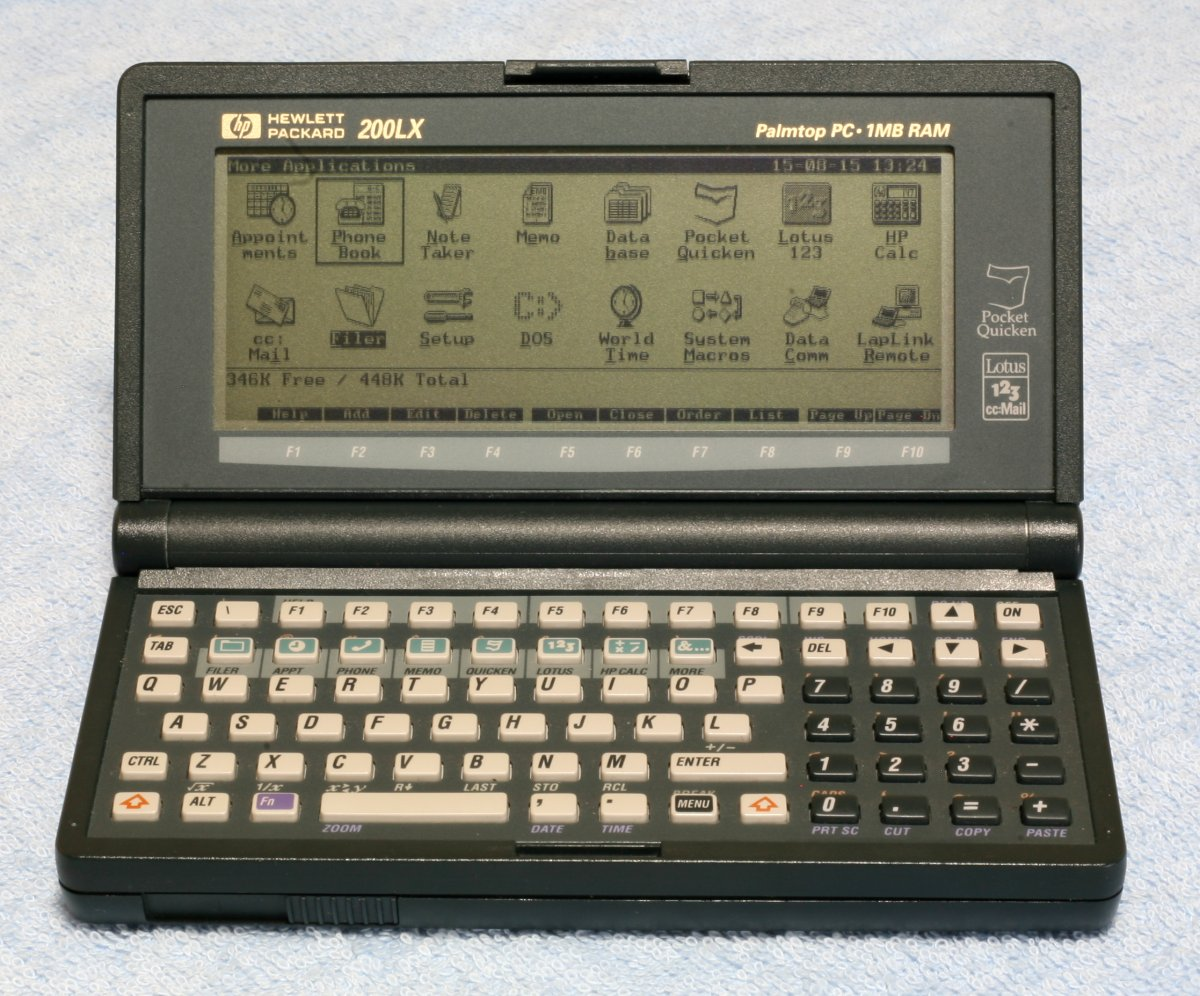
- Case open
- Manufacturer: Hewlett-Packard
- Type: Palmtop PC
- Released: August 1994; 32 years ago
- Discontinued: December 1999
- Operating system: Hewlett-Packard MS-DOS 5.0
- CPU: 80186-compatible "Hornet" @ 7.91 MHz
- Memory: 1/2/4 MB RAM
- Removable storage: SRAM, ATA Flash, Compact Flash. Up to 2 GB using third-party driver.
- Graphics: CGA 640×200 (2 colors); CGA 320x200 (4 colors)
- Power: 2× AA-size removable batteries, 1× CR2032 coin cell backup, optional AC adapter
- Dimensions: 16 × 8.64 × 2.54 cm (6.3" × 3.4" × 1")
- Predecessor: HP 100LX
- Successor: HP 300LX

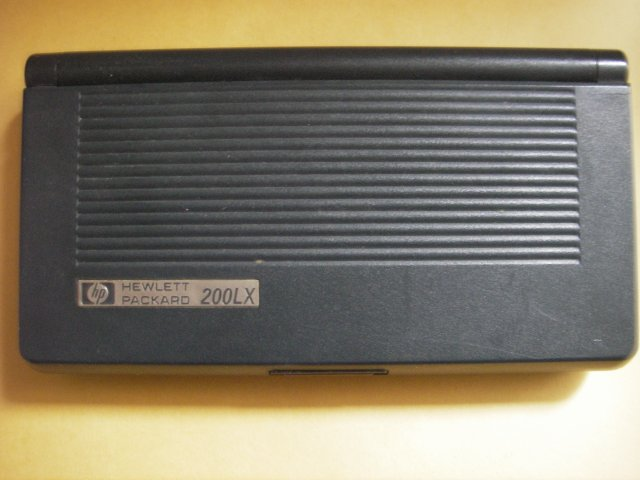
Case closed

The HP 200LX Palmtop PC (F1060A, F1061A, F1216A), also known as Project Felix, is a personal digital assistant introduced by Hewlett-Packard in August 1994. It was often called a Palmtop PC, and it was notable that it was, with some minor exceptions, a DOS-compatible computer in a palmtop format, complete with a monochrome graphic display, QWERTY keyboard, serial port, and PCMCIA expansion slot. The abbreviation "LX" stood for "Lotus Expandable".

== Description ==
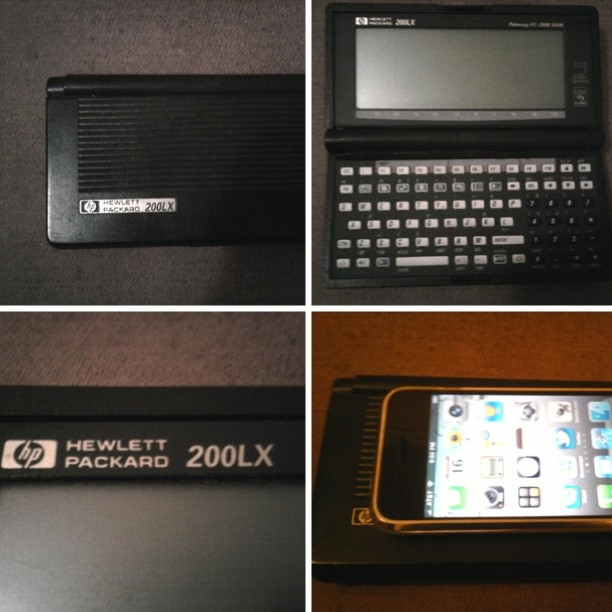
Size comparison with 2009 Apple iPhone 3GS

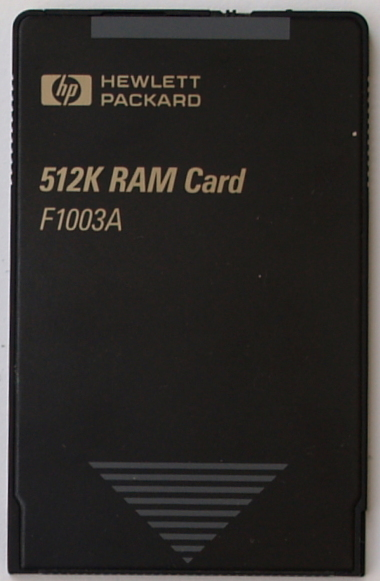
512 kB SRAM PCMCIA memory card for HP 95LX, HP 100LX and HP 200LX

Input is accomplished via a small QWERTY-keyboard with a numeric keypad, enclosed in a clamshell-style case, less than about 25% of the size of a standard notebook computer. The palmtop runs for about 30–40 hours on two size AA alkaline or Ni-Cd rechargeable cells and can charge batteries (both Ni-Cd and NiMH) via a 12 V DC wall adapter.

The HP 200LX has an Intel 80186 compatible embedded central processing unit named "Hornet", which runs at ~7.91 megahertz (which can be upgraded or overclocked to up to 15.8 MHz) and 1, 2 or 4 MB of memory, of which 640 KB is RAM and the rest can be used for expanded memory (EMS) or memory-based storage space. After-market updates can bring the memory chips to up to 64 MB, which frees the PCMCIA slot for modem or Ethernet card use. The Silicom, Accton 2212/2216, Netgear FA411, and Sohoware ND5120 network cards were compatible. Being IBM PC/XT compatible and running MS-DOS 5.0 from ROM, the HP 200LX can run virtually any program that would run on a full-size PC compatible computer as long as the code is written for the Intel 8086, 8088 or 80186 CPU and can run using CGA graphics. It can also run programs written for the 80286 CPU, provided they do not require the use of protected mode. It has a 16-bit PCMCIA Type II expansion slot that supports 5 V at 150 mA maximum, a SIR compatible infrared port and a full serial port (but with a proprietary mini connector for space constraint reasons).

The built-in software suite runs from ROM and includes the Lotus 1-2-3 Release 2.4 spreadsheet, a calendar, a phone book, a terminal, Lotus cc:Mail and a scientific/business calculator (among other applications). With a large CompactFlash storage card and a serial mouse, Microsoft Windows 3.0 can be run on the palmtop. Running Windows was limited by the hardware, and the maximum version that can be run is Windows 3.0 in Real Mode. However, Microsoft Word 1.x and Excel 2.x for Windows will run (since they can run in Real Mode), allowing for the authoring of MS Office format-compatible files. The 640×200 resolution CGA compatible 4-shade gray-scale LCD screen has no back light. An electroluminescent back light installation is available from a third party since 2004, but keen eyesight is still required to use the small palmtop effectively without resorting to using its 2× and 4× zoom modes.

While true CGA displays do not allow for redefinable fonts in text mode and support a hardware code page 437, the HP 95LX supports code page 850 instead. Starting with the HP 100LX, the LX series supports user-switchable text mode ROM fonts for both code page 437 and 850 as well as software-definable RAM fonts (for codepages 437G, 437T, 852, 866 via KEYBEZ). Lotus 1-2-3 internally uses the Lotus International Character Set (LICS), but characters are translated to code page 850 for display and printing purposes.

== Model variants ==
=== HP 100LX ===
The HP 100LX Palmtop PC (F1020A for the 1 MB, F1022A for the 2 MB model), also known as project Cougar, is the direct predecessor of the 200LX. It was released in 1993 and available in International English, U.S. English, French, German and Spanish variants with localized keyboard and messages. It is almost the same, including the Hornet CPU and MS-DOS 5.0, but with earlier built-in application versions.

=== HP Palmtop FX ===
The HP Palmtop FX is a variant of the HP 100LX with up to 2 MB flashable memory in 1993. FAT flash disk images could be created and written to drive F: by a special FLASHDSK.EXE utility. According to one source, it was developed for a Korean insurance company.

=== HP 200LX AIA ===
The HP 200LX AIA is a 2 MB double-speed variant of the HP 200LX manufactured for the insurance company American International Assurance (AIA).

=== HP 1000CX ===
The HP 1000CX Palmtop PC (F1203A for the 1 MB in March 1995, F1222A for the 2 MB model in February 1997), also known as project Puma, is an economy version of the 200LX but without any built-in software except the MS-DOS 5.0 operating system in ROM. It was in widespread use among, for example, Coca-Cola warehouse managers, who loaded their own logistics software onto the machine. It has a black clamshell, while the 200LX has a dark green casing.

=== HP OmniGo 700LX ===
The HP OmniGo 700LX Communicator Plus (F1206A), codenamed Columbia, was a project of the HP calculator branch in Singapore. The HP OmniGo 700LX is a 2 MB HP 200LX redesigned to piggyback a Nokia 2110 GSM mobile telephone for wireless mobility. The HP 200LX motherboard was factory-modified to support a second PCMCIA slot for a Nokia Data Card. Owing to the relatively large size of the Nokia telephone, the HP OmniGo 700LX has a large, pebble-shaped casing, making it a handheld with a phone attached. It was announced in late 1995 as part of plans for a collaboration between HP and Nokia, with shipment started in March 1996. The production of the HP OmniGo 700LX ceased after the Nokia 2110 mobile telephone was rendered obsolete by later telephones. The device can be seen as a forerunner to the first smartphone, Nokia's Communicator 9000.

== Related models ==
=== HP 95LX ===
The HP 95LX Palmtop PC (F1000A for the 512 KB, F1010A for the 1 MB model) introduced the basic design in April 1991. It was known internally as project Jaguar. It has a NEC V20 CPU (an enhanced Intel 8088 clone with Intel 80186 instruction set compatibility and an additional Intel 8080 emulation mode) running at 5.37 MHz, but is hampered in running PC applications because of its quarter-CGA resolution LCD screen and MDA-compatible (instead of CGA) graphics chip. The HP 95LX for the most part only displayed graphics in a special LX graphics mode. It runs MS-DOS 3.22 and has Lotus 1-2-3 Release 2.2 built in. It also includes a CR2032 battery for memory backup when the AA batteries run out.

=== HP OmniGo 100 ===
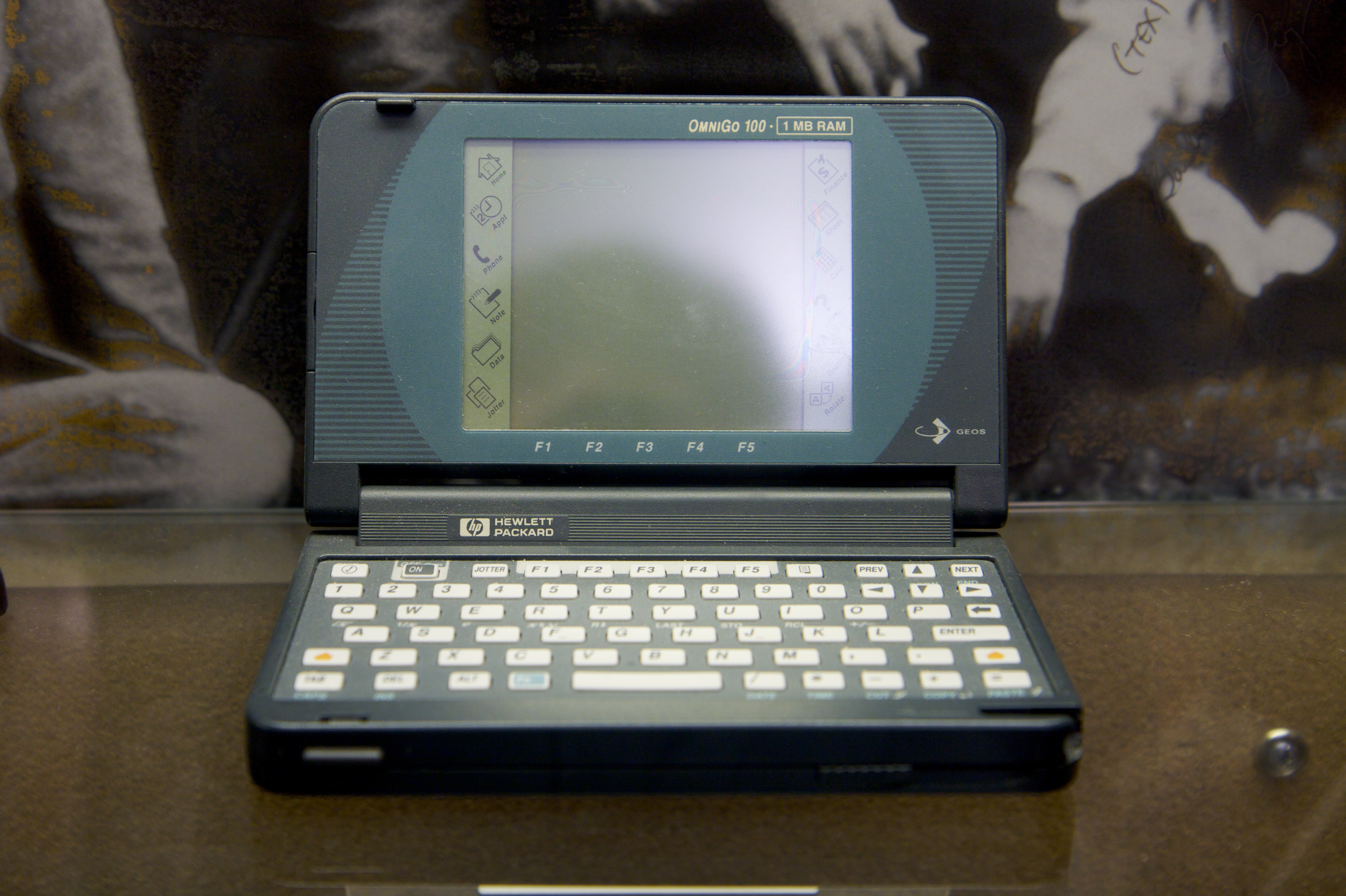
HP OmniGo 100

The HP OmniGo 100 Organizer Plus (F1305A/F1310A) was designed as a more sophisticated successor to the LX series, and incorporated the HP-12C calculator functionality. It was GUI-based, controlled by pen input or keyboard. However, it lacked the versatility of running unmodified DOS programs. The normal operation mode was with DOS-based PEN/GEOS 2.1 and Graffiti handwriting recognition running on Datalight ROM-DOS 6.22. It was not widely accepted as a calculator replacement, and Palm and Pocket PCs became acceptable as PDAs. Equipped with 1 MB of RAM, it was based on the Vadem VG230/V5H, a highly integrated system controller with 16 MHz NEC V30HL CPU, instruction set compatible with the Intel 80186.

== Current usage ==
Although this product line was discontinued by HP in order to introduce their Windows CE product line (starting with the HP 300LX), a strong interest in this hardware continued. It was the last palmtop from HP which ran the MS-DOS operating system, for which there is much software from desktop PCs, and it came with a useful bundle of software including 1-2-3 and Quicken. Compared to machines with Windows-based operating systems such as CE, DOS programs are more compact and efficient and, with programs such as Software Carousel, many applications programs could be loaded at once.

Third-party upgrades, repairs and renovations are available to maintain and extend the device.

Because of its small size, the HP 200LX was very popular in Japan, so much so that its demise prompted an open-source initiative led by a group named Morphy One to design and market an AMD Élan SC400-based replacement to fill its place in 2001. However, only one prototype was ever built before the company responsible for the project filed for bankruptcy in 2003. Some argue it was a scam as hundreds of people lost deposits they placed on the new palmtop in advance. The project leaders argued that key electronic components were unavailable due to strong demand from the mobile phone manufacturing industry.

== Common problems ==
- A common problem with the HP 200LX case is related to the injected-molded case top. The right hinge to case blend had poor flow in the process, resulting in the formation of a crack which propagates across the hinge under stress, causing failure. This can be reinforced and repaired using super glue, among other methods (industrial super glue advised). One can also use a small thin rectangular piece of metal and epoxy it to the upper right hand corner of the clam shell where the crack occurs. This offers additional support to the area and prevents and/or repairs this problem.
- Another weakness of the design is the failure of the case opening latch. This problem can easily be repaired by placing a thin slice cut from rubber eraser, left over silicone kit, or 'super sponge' within the latch as a "spring".
- Only high quality AA rechargeable batteries should be used in the HP 200LX, as battery leaks can destroy the LCD's flat video cable.
- Aging models may lose pixel columns from the display. This is caused by detachment of one or more pins of one of the SMD (Surface Mounted Device) chips in the display itself. In many cases this may be repaired by reflowing (resoldering) of the pins on the offending chip, either with an SMD reflow tool, or a soldering iron with a very fine (0.2 mm) tip.
- Under heavy use, the space bar and enter bar can become detached. This requires keyboard replacement.
- Under heavy use from opening and closing, the long flex strip connector between the screen and the motherboard can become torn as it tends to rub against internal components in the housing. Typically, the only way to fix this once torn is to replace the flex strip.
- Fixing unresponsive keyboard keys. Inside the HP 200LX, the keyboard connects to the main board via a "ribbon" that has graphite pads which make physical contact to gold pads plated onto the main board. Unresponsive keys occur when this connection grows weak. This can be fixed by applying conductive silver paint (such as from a circuitwriter pen) to each graphite pad on the "ribbon". One can also use copper tape cut out to small circles. This tape adheres nicely to the graphite pad and actually gives a more definitive long lasting connection than silver paint, although both work fine. This is delicate work, and putting the HP 200LX back together after disassembly may be problematic for those who have little experience with electronics repair. However, the conductive silver paint will fully fix the problem if applied with care. An alternate cause can be corrosion of the motherboard pads to which the graphite pad connects. This can be solved by polishing the pads with fine steel wool.

== Exceptions to 100% IBM PC compatibility ==
- The HP 100LX/HP 200LX's digital-to-analog converter cannot play audio tones; instead, it monitors battery life and charging.
- The device does not provide the BIOS service (INT 13h) for reading from a hard disk. Drivers have been partially written for this purpose (to boot MINIX 2.0).

== Other notes ==
- The HP 200LX was used on board the NASA Discovery OV103 Mission STS-95 (the last mission of Senator John Glenn) in an Electronic Nose (E-Nose) experiment (the device was developed jointly by Jet Propulsion Laboratory (JPL) and the California Institute of Technology (Caltech)). The experiment, as managed by Dan Karmon of JPL, was successful.
- The HP 200LX can play video, and sound files using software from Stefan Peichl in relatively low quality. It is also capable of sound recording, though this is, again, in relatively low quality. There is no known compatible PCMCIA sound card for the HP 200LX. However, a Yamaha MU10 MIDI sound generator (a.o.) works through the serial port using Voyetra or GSPlay MIDI programs, and Terrence Vergauwen uses a PCMCIA parallel port card plus an OPL3LPT (Adlib- compatible sound card thru parallel port) for gaming.
- Software and hardware is available which will allow the HP 200LX to surf the Internet.
- The serial numbers printed on the HP machines 100LX, 200LX, 1000CX and OmniGo 700LX have the following meaning:

XXYWWNNNNN
XX	= the country of manufacturing (e.g., SG = Singapore etc)
Y	= the year of manufacturing; last digit (e.g., 6 = 1996)
WW	= the week of the year of manufacturing
NNNNN	= the number of the specific unit manufactured in specified week

== Easter eggs ==
There are many easter eggs built into the HP 200LX. The known ones are listed as follows:

=== Hidden gallery ===
This easter egg is on the HP 200LX in the built in game, "Lair of Squid". During the startup screen of the game, if the user types the word "gallery" ("gallerie" on a French palmtop; "siegergalerie" on a German palmtop; "galeria" on a Spanish palmtop) they are placed in a "part" of the maze that contains photographs of the primary software developers that worked on the HP 200LX. The user may exit from this gallery by exiting through the door at the end of the corridor. The software developers in the photographs are listed starting from left to right, then left to right and so on as follows:

- Andy Gryc
- Pat Megowan
- Everett Kaser
- Bill Johnson
- Lynn Winter
- Susan Wechsler
- Eric Evett

The last panel on the right of the corridor contains a thank you message:

Very special thanks to all the people in HP and all the companies that made this palm-top possible. The Felix S/W team

The photographs of the developers have been described as "a-maze-ing".

=== Self-test poem 1 ===
This easter egg is in the HP 200LX self test mode. With the palmtop powered off, the user may press ESC+ON to start the self test mode, then cursor down to the display option. On pressing ↵ Enter 14 times, to step through the various screens, the user comes to a screen of example text in the form of a limerick poem. The poem is as follows:

There once was this thing from HP

That fit in your pocket, you see.
A caveman would stare
And pull out his hair

And wonder, 'What could this thing be?'

=== Self-test poem 2 ===
This easter egg is in the HP 200LX self test mode. With the palmtop powered off, the user may press ESC+ON to start the self test mode, then cursor down to the display option. On pressing CTRL+↵ Enter, then holding down ALT while pressing ↵ Enter 13 times, the user comes to a cryptic poem, relating to business issues faced by the software development team. The poem is as follows:

Felis Concolor

A funny thing happened on the way to the Forum
When I encountered a group in search of a quorum.
They came from a city, The Burg On The Wire.
If I tried to describe it you'd call me a liar.
They wanted to charge me a really quite large fee
For the dubious pleasure of sharing their treasure.
"I'm a very Good man (Mark my words if you can),"
"But, the Dickens, I say, I simply won't pay!"
And with poetry, then, I proceeded to bore 'em

Then proceeded myself on my way to the Forum.

=== Self-test poem 3 ===
This easter egg is in the HP 200LX self test mode. With the palmtop powered off, the user may press ESC+ON to start the self test mode, then cursor down to the display option. On pressing CTRL+↵ Enter, then holding down ⇧ Shift while pressing ↵ Enter 13 times, the user comes to an allegorical poem about the history and future of the HP LX palmtops. The poem is as follows (note that the project names for the HP 95LX, the HP 100LX and the HP 200LX are 'Jaguar', 'Cougar' and 'Felix' respectively, and that 'Felix' was the first LX to include Quicken):

Nine lives has a Cat, and each Cat a name,

All of them different, none are the same.
Jaguar was first, it made quite a roar.
Cougar was next, oh, how it did soar.
Felix is third, my heart it does quicken,

Who knows what comes next, the clock is a tickin'.

=== Hidden development aid in 'More Applications' ===
This easter egg is in the built in System Manager of the HP 200LX. This 'easter egg' is probably more of a development tool than an easter egg, but, in any case, the user may display the function by first pressing the blue &... key to start 'More Applications'. The user may then hold down ALT while pressing F9 four times, followed by F10 once. As long as the ALT key is held down, the user will observe columns of data about System Manager compliant (.EXM) programs registered with the System Manager, along with other arcane program information.

=== Hidden hex calculator ===
The HP 200LX includes an undocumented calculator application named HEXCALC, written by Andrew Gryc. It provides arithmetical and logical operations in binary, octal, decimal and hexadecimal system. The utility can be added to the applications menu by an entry with the following fields:

- Name: He&x Calc
- Path: D:\BIN\HEXCALC.EXM

== See also ==
- HP 110 / HP 110 Plus
- DIP Pocket PC / Atari PC Folio / Atari Portfolio
- Poqet PC
- Poqet PC Prime
- Poqet PC Plus
- ZEOS Pocket PC
- Ben NanoNote
- Sub-notebook (HP OmniBook)
- Netbook
- Palmtop PC
- Ultra-mobile PC
