= HP 110 =

1984 computer by Hewlett-Packard

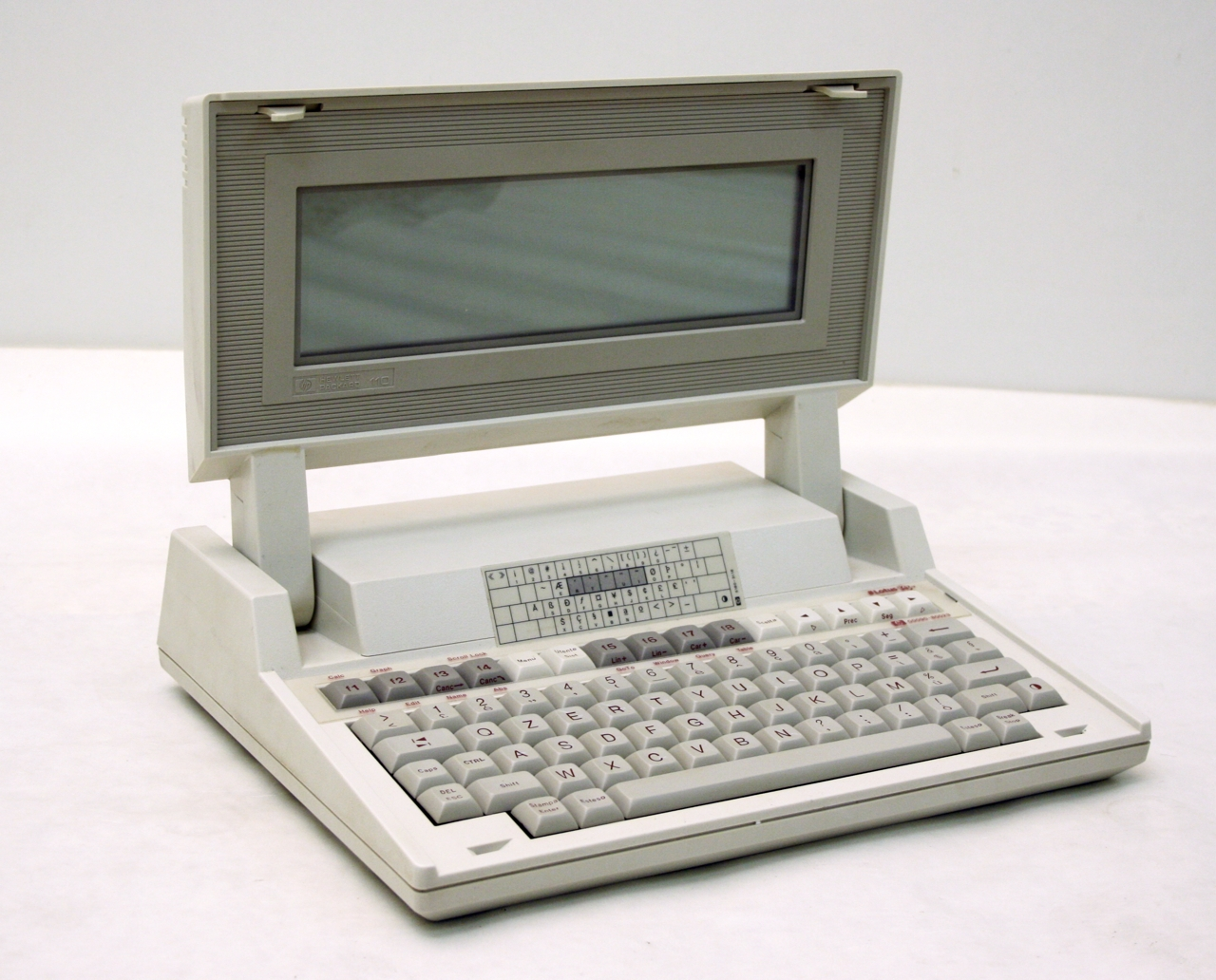
- Manufacturer: Hewlett-Packard
- Type: Laptop
- Released: May 1984; 42 years ago
- Introductory price: US$2,995 (equivalent to $9,280 in 2025)
- Operating system: MS-DOS 2.11 or CP/M-86
- CPU: Harris 80C86 at 5.33 MHz
- Memory: 272 KB

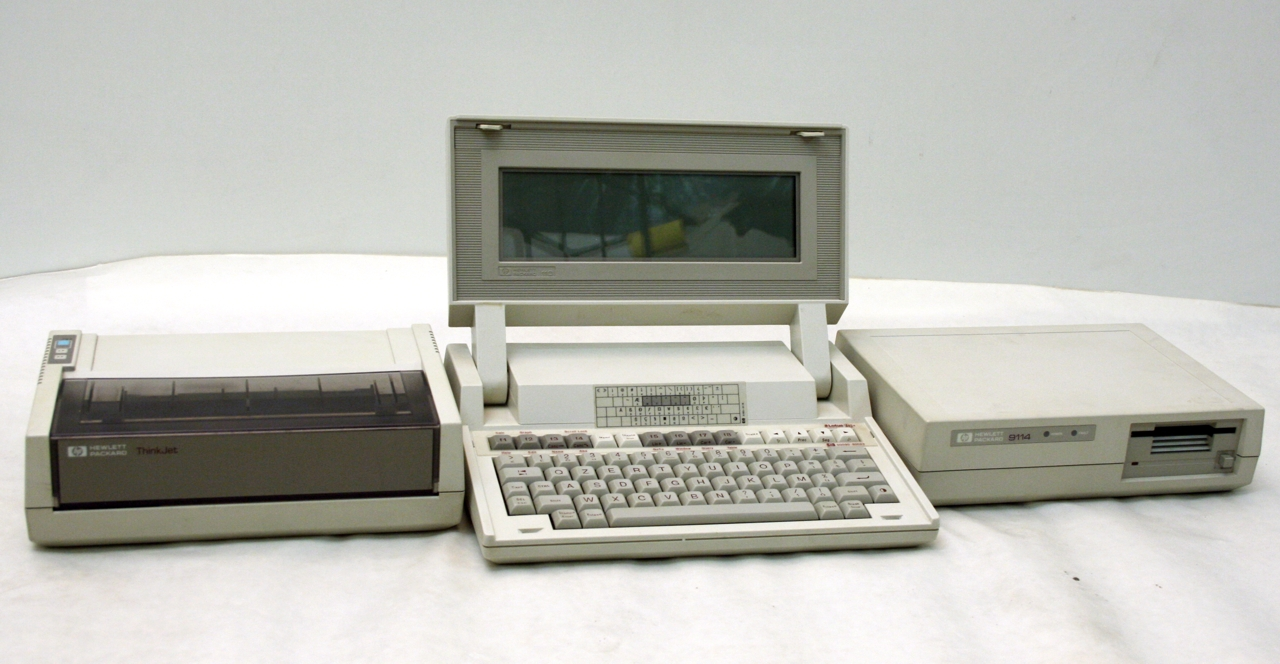
HP 110 with HP ThinkJet (left) and HP 9114 3.5" floppy disk drive

The HP 110 (aka HP Portable and HP 45710A) is an MS-DOS-compatible laptop released in May 1984 by Hewlett-Packard. It runs off batteries and uses a Harris 80C86 running at 5.33 MHz with 272 KB of RAM. It has an 80 character by 16 line monochrome (480 × 128 pixel) liquid crystal display, runs MS-DOS 2.11 in ROM, and has the application programs MemoMaker, Terminal Emulator and Lotus 1-2-3 in ROM. It was HP's first laptop.

The LCD can be tilted for visibility, and can be folded down over the keyboard for transport, unlike computers such as the TRS-80 Model 100 which has the display in the same fixed plane as the keyboard. The HP 110 is similar to the Dulmont Magnum and the Sharp PC-5000, but all three computers were separately developed by their respective companies. At introduction it had a list price of US$2995 (today $9280).

== HP 110 Plus ==
In 1985 the HP 110 Plus (aka HP Portable Plus and HP 45711A) was released with a higher-speed internal modem (1200 baud vs. 300 baud), more resident applications, reduced price, and an 80 character by 25 line display, which improved compatibility with desktop software applications. In text mode, the machine supported either a derivation of the 1984 version of the HP Roman-8 (Note: The HP Roman-8 implementation in the HP Portable Plus did not support the changes incorporated into the 1985 revision of HP Roman-8, that is it still lacked code points 177 (Ý), 178 (ý), 242 (·), 243 (µ), 244 (¶) and 245 (¾) and the appearance of code point 228 was still a stroked d (đ) rather than an eth (ð). The HP Portable Plus did however define 32 additional graphical symbols for code points 128 to 159, which are not part of the standard HP Roman-8 character set.) character set (in "HP mode") or IBM code page 437 (in "ALT mode").

== Reception ==
BYTE in January 1985 acknowledged the HP 110's high price, but stated that it was "a computer with true desktop capability and performance well worth its cost for those who need the power". It praised the keyboard, and predicted that the built-in Lotus 1-2-3 "will likely account for more HP 110 sales than any other single feature".

Creative Computing said that the 110 was "the overwhelming winner" in the category of notebook portables when "price is no object" for 1984. The magazine stated that the $2995 price was "surprising modest" for its hardware, Lotus 1-2-3 and other software, and excellent manufacturer support.

== See also ==
- HP 95LX
- HP 100LX
- HP 200LX
