= Atari Portfolio =

IBM PC-compatible palm computer by Atari

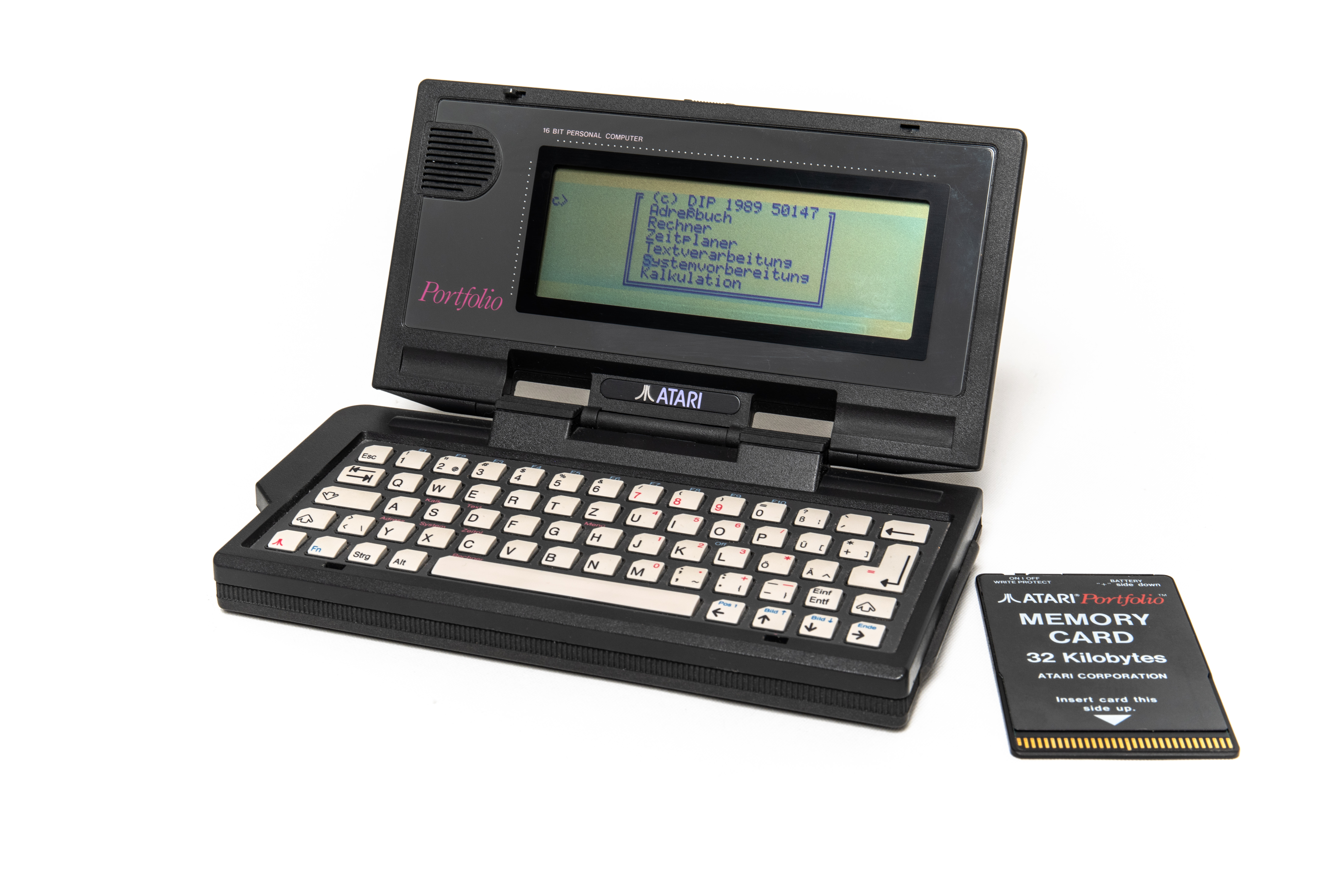
- Also known as: Atari PC Folio, DIP Pocket PC
- Type: Palmtop PC
- Released: June 1989; 37 years ago
- Introductory price: US$399.95 (equivalent to $1,040 in 2025)
- Discontinued: 1993
- Operating system: DIP DOS 2.11
- CPU: 80C88 @ 4.9152 MHz
- Memory: 128 KB RAM; 256 KB ROM
- Display: Monochrome LCD (no backlight); 40 characters × 8 lines
- Graphics: 240 × 64 pixels
- Sound: Tiny speaker (DTMF)
- Input: Keyboard 63 keys, QWERTY layout
- Power: 3× AA removable alkaline batteries (Optional AC adapter)
- Dimensions: 20 cm × 10.5 cm x 2.5 cm (7.5" × 4" × 1.25")
- Weight: 505 g (17.5 oz)

The Atari Portfolio is the world's first IBM PC-compatible palmtop PC, released by Atari Corporation in June 1989.

== History ==
DIP Research Ltd. based at the Surrey Research Park in Guildford, Surrey, UK developed the first MS-DOS-compatible palmtop PC, the DIP Pocket PC. It was IBM PC-compatible at the BIOS level, but not at the I/O port level. A prototype version was released in early 1989 as a proof of concept.

Atari became aware of this release, and saw a market opportunity. It licensed the electronics & software design from DIP, and applied its production engineering expertise to create a consumer version of the product with a new case and keyboard.

This product was marketed as the Atari Portfolio in the US & UK, and in other countries later on. In Germany, Italy, and Spain it was initially called the PC Folio due to trademark restrictions. Atari acquired the rights to the name Portfolio in Germany and Spain, but it was always called the PC Folio in Italy.

DIP continued to evolve the electronics design (including expansion modules) and all the ROM software, supplying software updates to Atari over the production cycle. Its licensing agreement enabled it to source Portfolios from Atari at a reduced cost, which it rebranded and sold as the production version of the DIP Pocket PC in the UK. Note the Atari key on the keyboard.

DIP Research also developed the Sharp PC-3000/3100, released in late 1991. The company was acquired by Phoenix Technologies in 1994.

Officially the name DIP stood for Distributed Information Processing, unofficial it was initials of the founders David Frodsham, Ian Cullimore and Peter Baldwin.

Prior to founding DIP the founders and several staff members had worked at Psion (company).

== Technology ==
The Portfolio uses an Intel 80C88 CPU running at 4.9152 MHz. It has 128 KB of RAM, and 256 KB of ROM which contains the BIOS, DOS & command shell, as well as several personal information management (PIM) applications.

The RAM has 4 KB allocated as video RAM, with the remainder divided between system memory and local storage (the C: drive). The LCD is monochrome without backlight and has 240 × 64 pixels or 40 characters × 8 lines.

There is a small speaker on the display bezel. In addition to simulated key-clicks, beeps and musical tones, this can output Dual-Tone Multi-Frequency (DTMF) tones which are used by touch-tone phones to dial numbers. Telephone numbers in the address book can be speed-dialed by holding a telephone handset against the Portfolio’s speaker.

Power is supplied by three AA size removable alkaline batteries. The computer's memory is preserved during battery changes. There is also an optional AC adapter (120 V: HPC-401, 230 V: HPC-402).

DIP Operating System 2.11

The Portfolio's "DIP Operating System 2.11" is compatible with MS-DOS 2.11. Most text-based DOS applications can run on the Portfolio as long as they don’t access the hardware directly, due to the lack of PC-compatible I/O ports.

Built-in PIM applications include a spreadsheet (Lotus 1-2-3 compatible), text editor, address book with DTMF dialing, diary with alarms, and a calculator.

Mitsubishi Plastics Bee Cards are used as removable memory cards for file storage, which are inserted into a slot on the left side of the Portfolio. They are accessed as drive A: and use a DOS FAT file system. They're not compatible with the PC card standard as they pre-date it.

Read/write memory cards were available from Atari in three sizes: 32 KB (HPC-201), 64 KB (HPC-202), and 128 KB (HPC-203), and later from third party suppliers in capacities up to 4 MB. The RAM in a read/write memory card is backed up by a replaceable coin-cell battery, which lasts around two years.

Read-only memory cards (listed in Accessories below) include a utility pack (HPC-701), finance manager (HPC-702), science pack (HPC-703), file manager (HPC-704), and several others including a chess game (HPC-750).

A card reader (HPC-301) connects to a desktop PC which can then access the memory cards. The kit contains an ISA card, a special cable, the card reader, and driver software distributed on floppy disk.

There is an expansion port on the right side of the Portfolio, that enables peripheral modules to be attached.

A Memory Expander+ (HPC-104) RAM expansion unit is available. Each unit gives the Portfolio an additional 256 KB of RAM. It passes all signal lines through it, so another expansion module can be attached. Up to two can be joined together to increase the total system RAM to 640 KB, with the first one also providing memory card drive B:.

A Smart Parallel Port (HPC-101) and Serial Port (HPC-102) interface are available, as well as a number of third party peripherals. One example is a modem expansion module that converts the Portfolio into a miniature computer terminal. The modem is powered from the Portfolio and comes with an acoustic coupler, as well as the option for a direct connection.

The Portfolio can be connected to a PC for transferring files to and from the unit using the Smart Parallel Port expansion module (HPC-101), a standard parallel cable, and the (DOS based) File Transfer software.

There are no LEDs associated with the keyboard. However, the Lock key may be used to trigger an overlay with various information including the current state of NUM, CAP, SCR keys. Those may be toggled by pushing Lock + Atari, Lock + Shift, and Lock + Fn.

Credits for the development of the product can be found in an easter egg. Launch the Setup application. Set the language to English. Select Help, and from within a help screen press Alt+[ ("Alt" plus "left square bracket").

== Product codes ==
The product code HPC-0XX specifies the keyboard layout:

- Atari Portfolio HPC-004: English keyboard
- Atari Portfolio HPC-005: French keyboard
- Atari Portfolio HPC-006: German keyboard
- Atari Portfolio HPC-007: Italian keyboard
- Atari PC Folio HPC-008: Spanish keyboard
- Atari Portfolio HPC-009: Swedish/Danish keyboard
- Atari Portfolio HPC-010: Swiss French/Swiss German keyboard

== ROM versions ==
There were four ROM versions released over the production cycle:

- Version 1.030 was the initial production release (ROMs dated 22 May 1989), with a limited number of units shipped. It supported English, French & German keyboards and text languages only. It contained a number of software bugs.
- ROM version 1.052 was the second production release, supporting English, French & German. It contained some software bugs.
- ROM version 1.07X was the mainstream production release, which was generally bug free. Version 1.072 supported English, French and German. Version 1.073 supported English, Italian & Spanish. Version 1.074 supported English, Swedish & Danish. Version 1.075 supported English, Swiss French & Swiss German.
- ROM version 1.13X was the final production release. Amongst other things, it included some bug-fixes for large memory cards. Version 1.130 supported English, French and German. Version 1.131 supported English, Italian & Spanish. Version 1.132 supported English, Swedish & Danish. Version 1.133 supported English, Swiss French & Swiss German.

Atari/DIP provided a utility called UPDATE.COM that provided run-time fixes for serious bugs.

== Accessories ==
- Atari HPC-101 Smart parallel interface
- Atari HPC-102 Serial interface
- Atari HPC-103 Memory expansion (not released)
- Atari HPC-104 Memory expander+
- Atari HPC-201 Memory card 32 KB
- Atari HPC-202 Memory card 64 KB
- Atari HPC-203 Memory card 128 KB
- Atari HPC-204 OTPROM card 512 KBit
- Atari HPC-205 OTPROM card 1 MBit
- Atari HPC-301 PC Card drive for PC ISA bus
- Atari HPC-401 Mains adapter 110 V
- Atari HPC-402 Mains adapter 220 V
- Atari HPC-406 Parallel cable
- Atari HPC-407 Serial cable
- Atari HPC-408 Parallel printer cable
- Atari HPC-409 Null modem cable
- Atari HPC-501 OTPROM adapter 512 KBit
- Atari HPC-502 OTPROM adapter 1 MBit
- Atari HPC-701 ROM card "Utility"
- Atari HPC-702 ROM card "Finance"
- Atari HPC-703 ROM card "Science"
- Atari HPC-704 ROM card "File Manager"
- Atari HPC-705 ROM card "Power BASIC"
- Atari HPC-709 ROM card "Instant Spell"
- Atari HPC-711 ROM card "U.S. Traveller's Guide)"
- Atari HPC-713 ROM card "Hyperlist"
- Atari HPC-715 ROM card "Language Translator"
- Atari HPC-724 ROM card "Bridge Baron"
- Atari HPC-725 ROM card "Wine Companion"
- Atari HPC-726 ROM card "Diet / Cholesterol Counter"
- Atari HPC-728 ROM card "Astrologer"
- Atari HPC-729 ROM card "Stock Tracker"
- Atari HPC-750 ROM card "Chess"
- Atari HPC-803 Portfolio system case

== In popular culture ==
The Atari Portfolio was used by the character John Connor to crack PINs in two scenes in the 1991 film Terminator 2: Judgment Day.

== Gallery ==
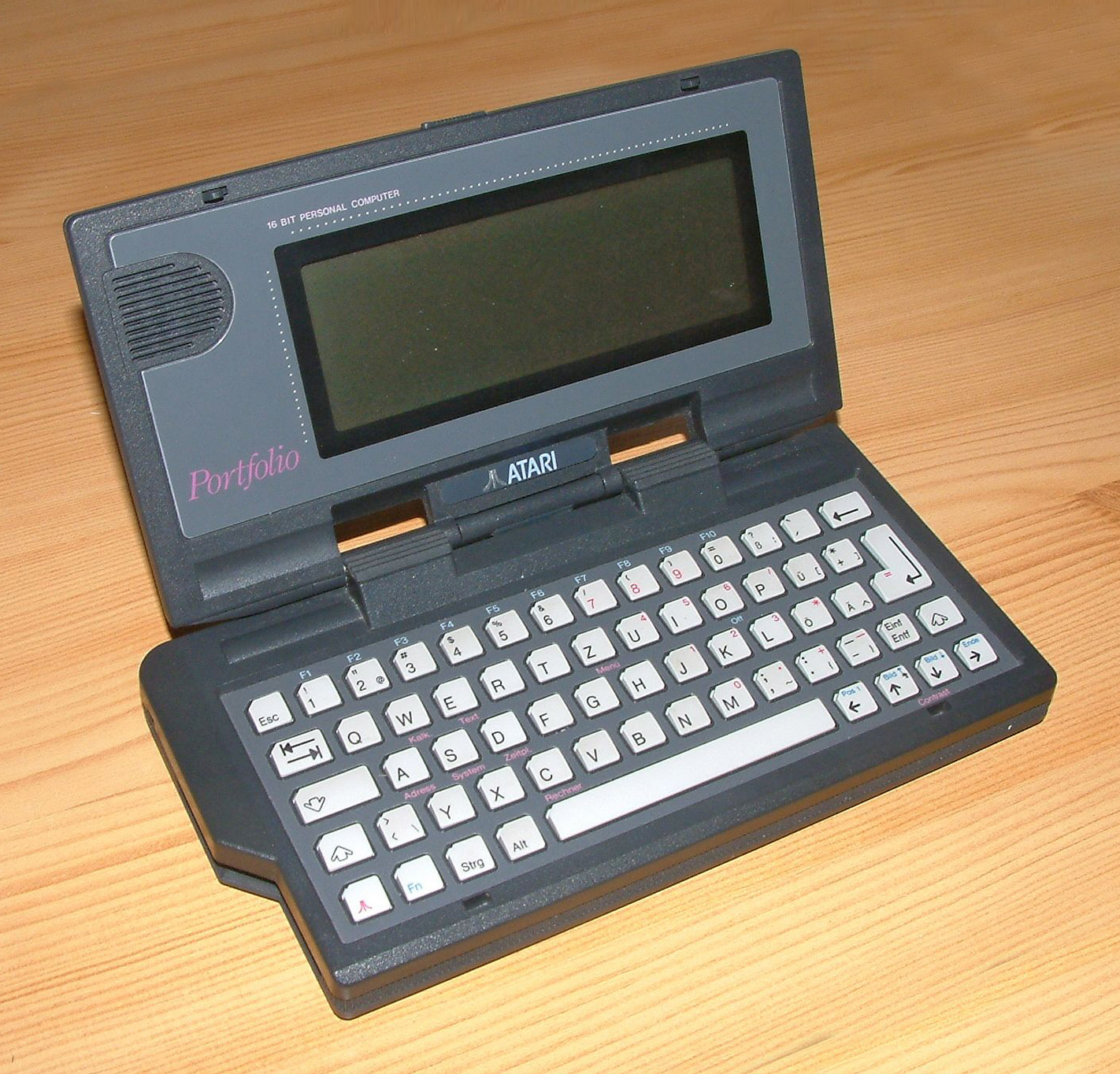

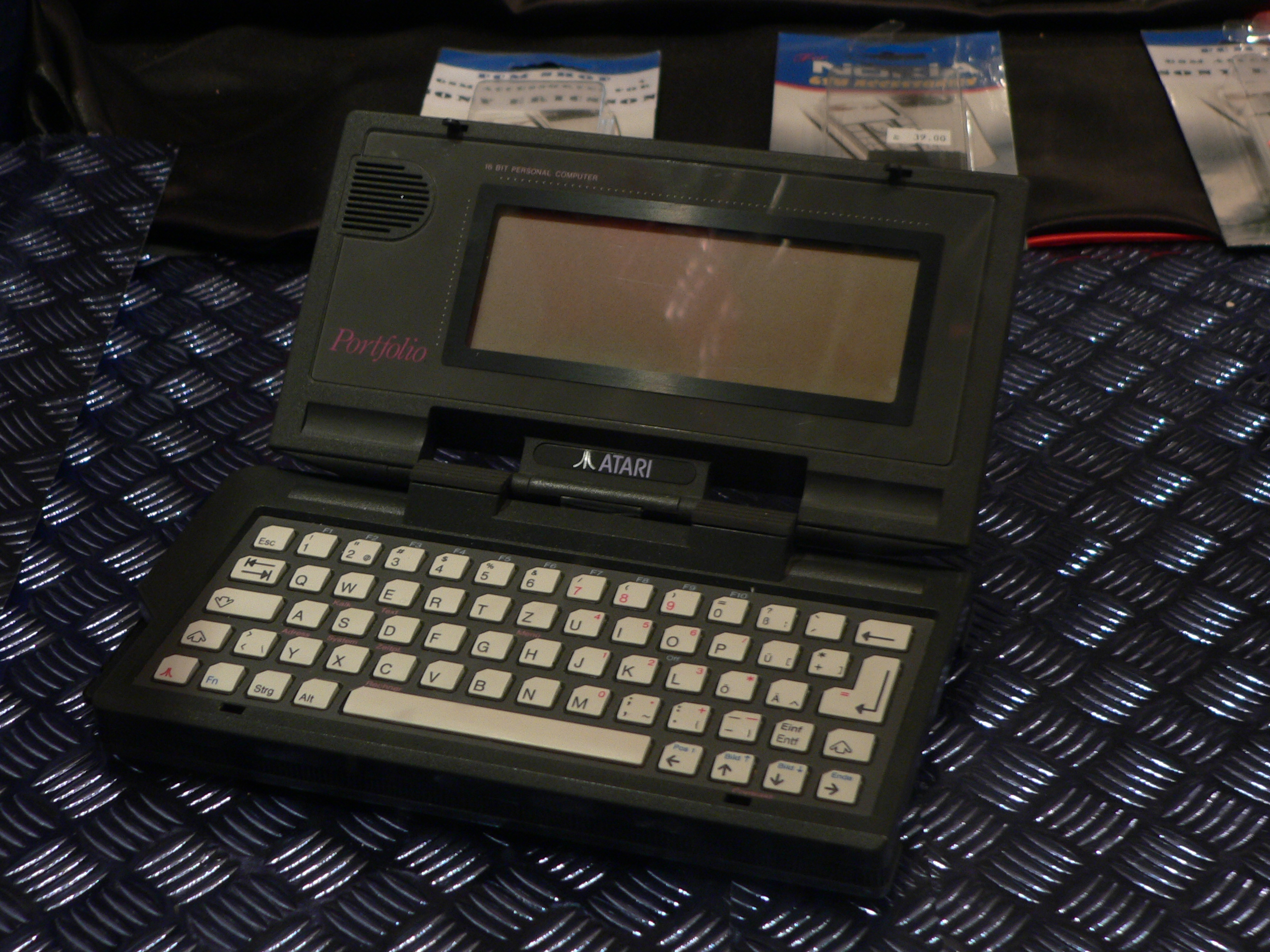

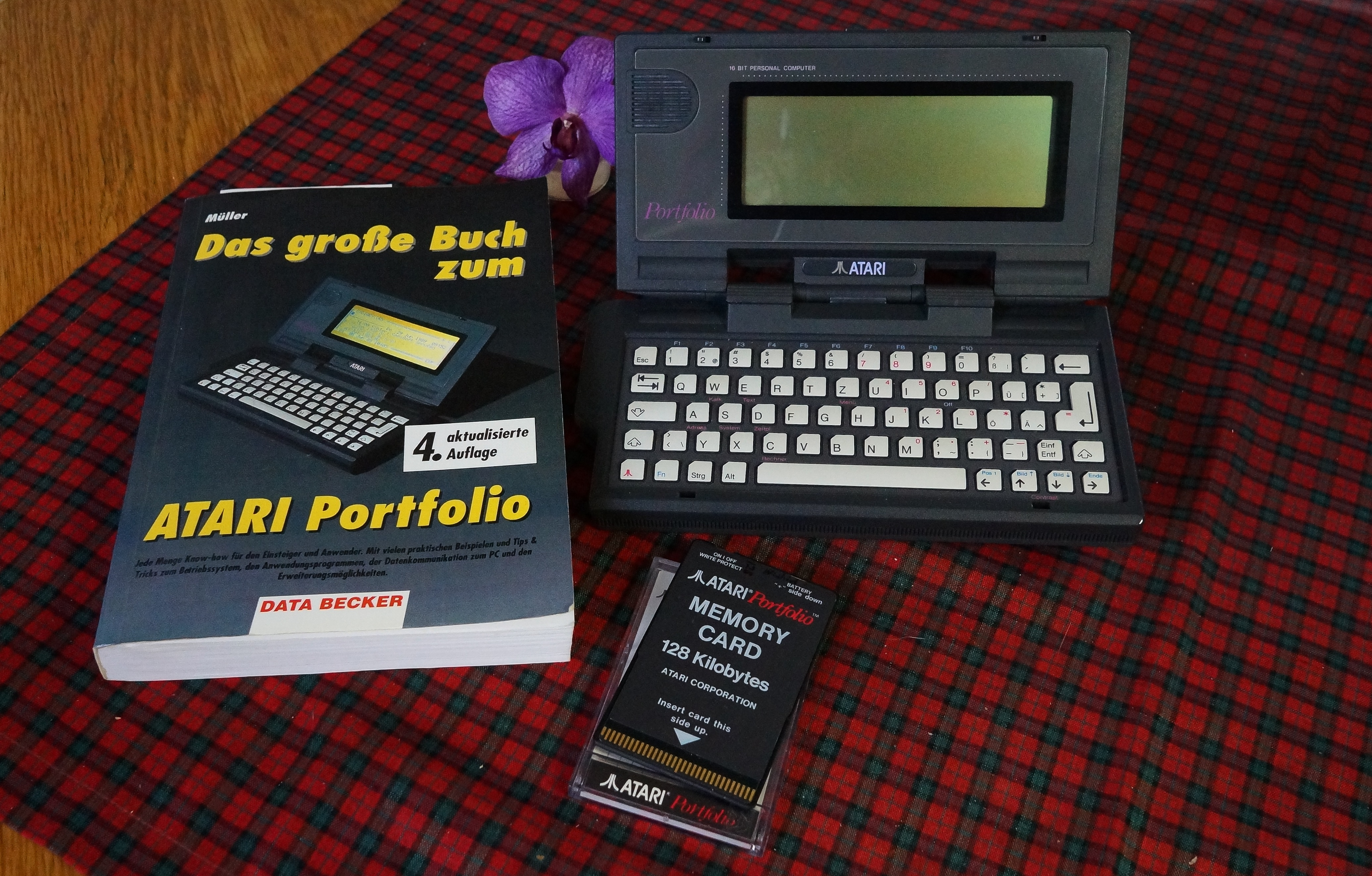

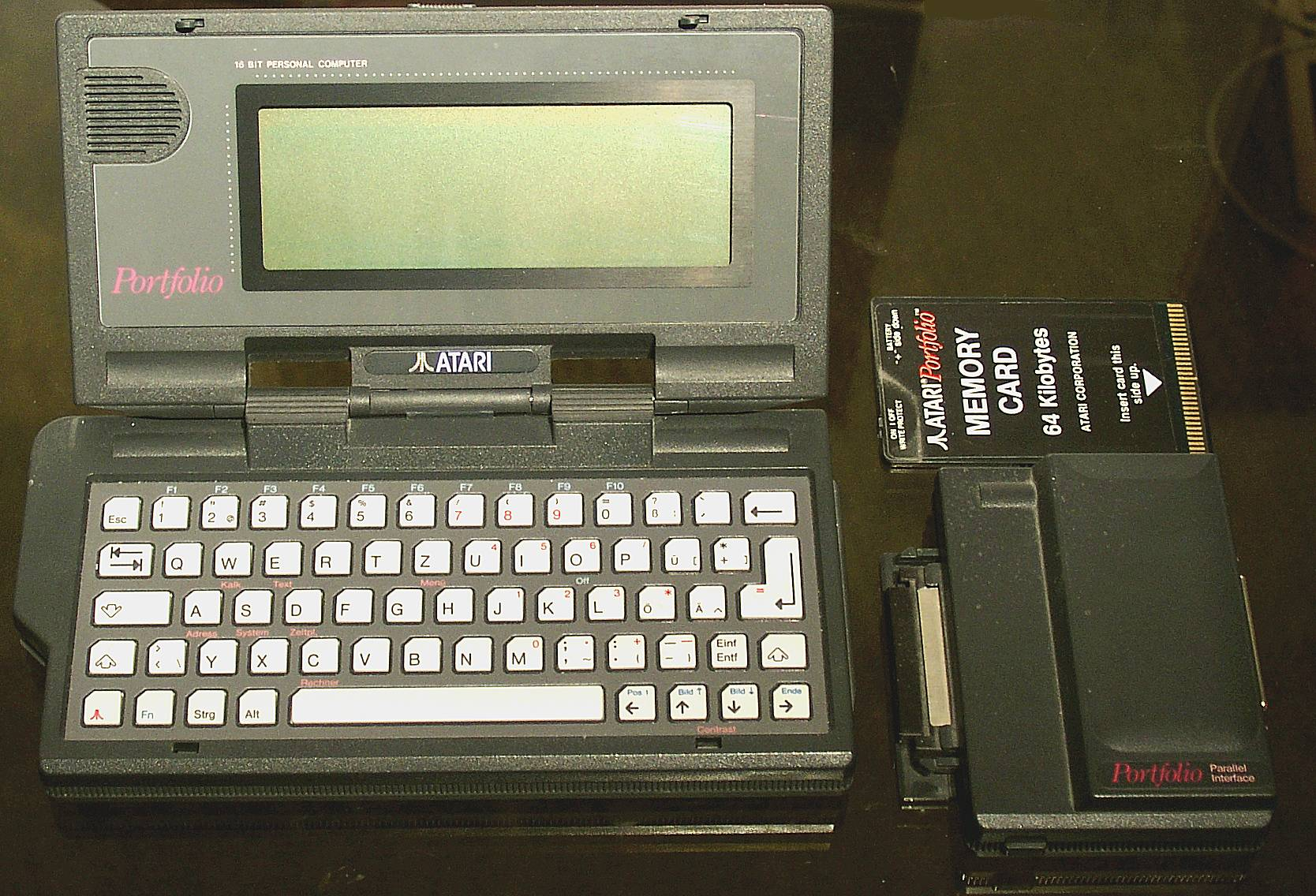

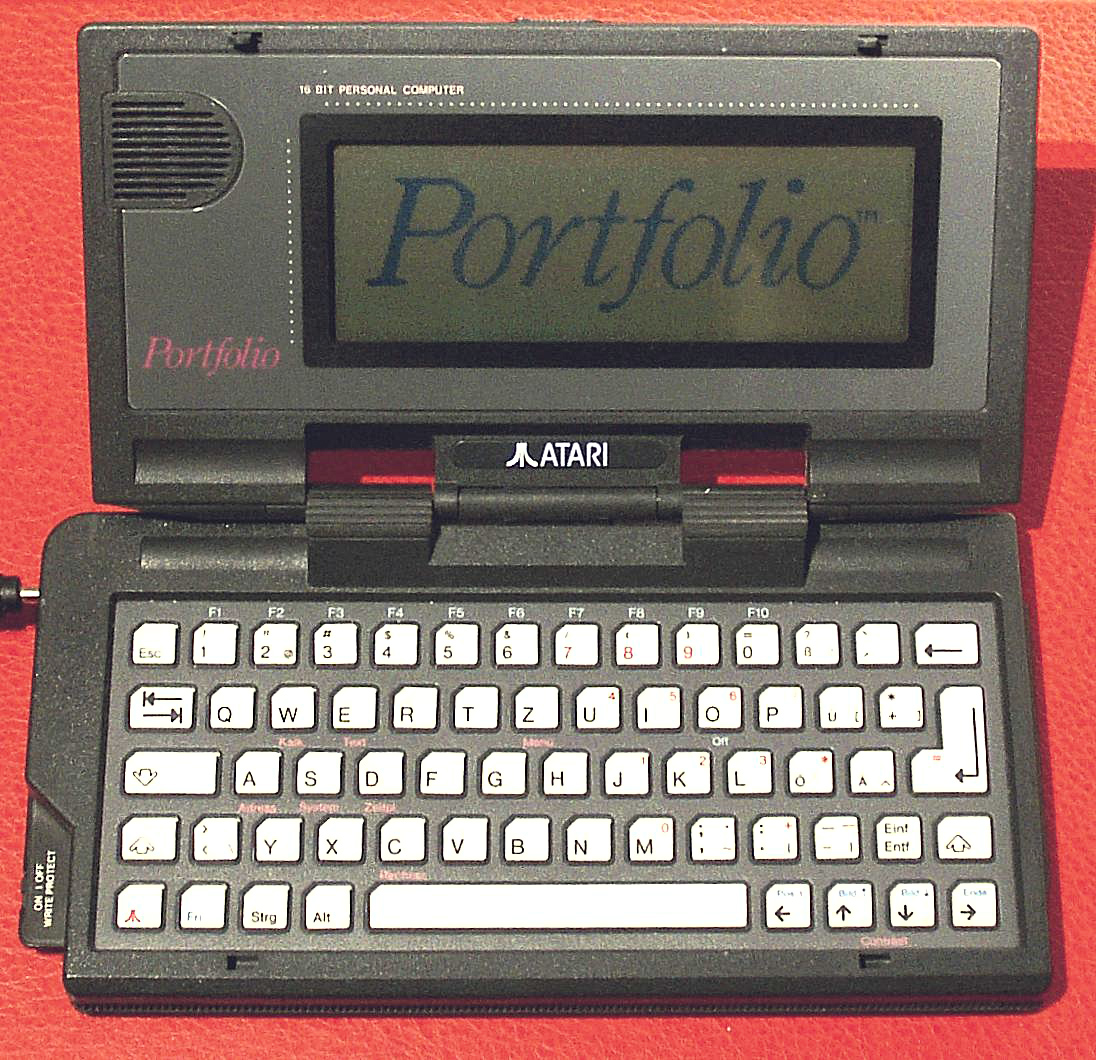

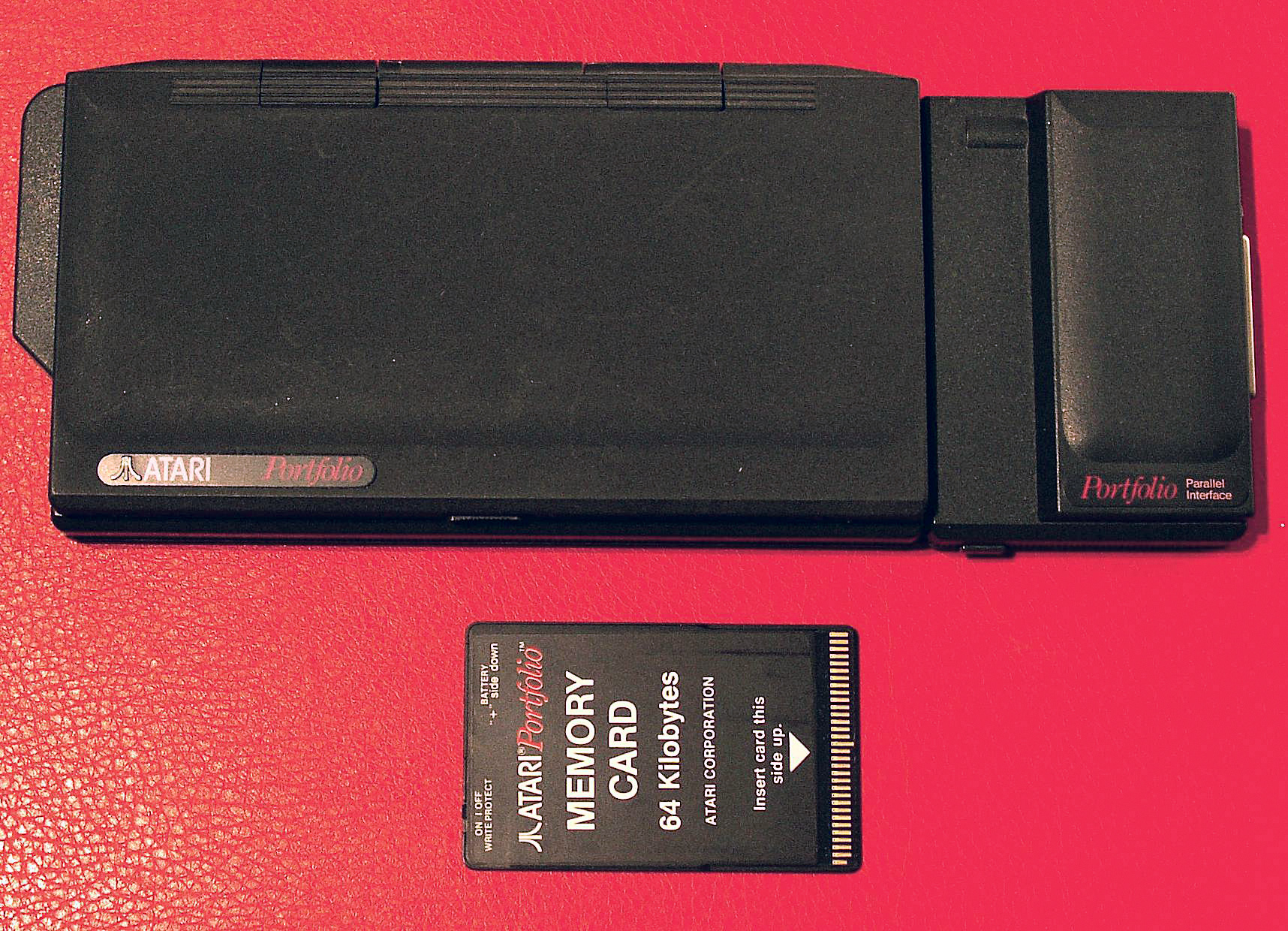

== See also ==
- Poqet PC
- Poqet PC Prime
- Poqet PC Plus
- HP 95LX
- HP 100LX
- HP 200LX
- HP 1000CX
- HP OmniGo 700LX
- Toshiba Libretto
- Sharp PC-3000
- ZEOS Pocket PC
