= Electronic organizer =

Calculator-size computer

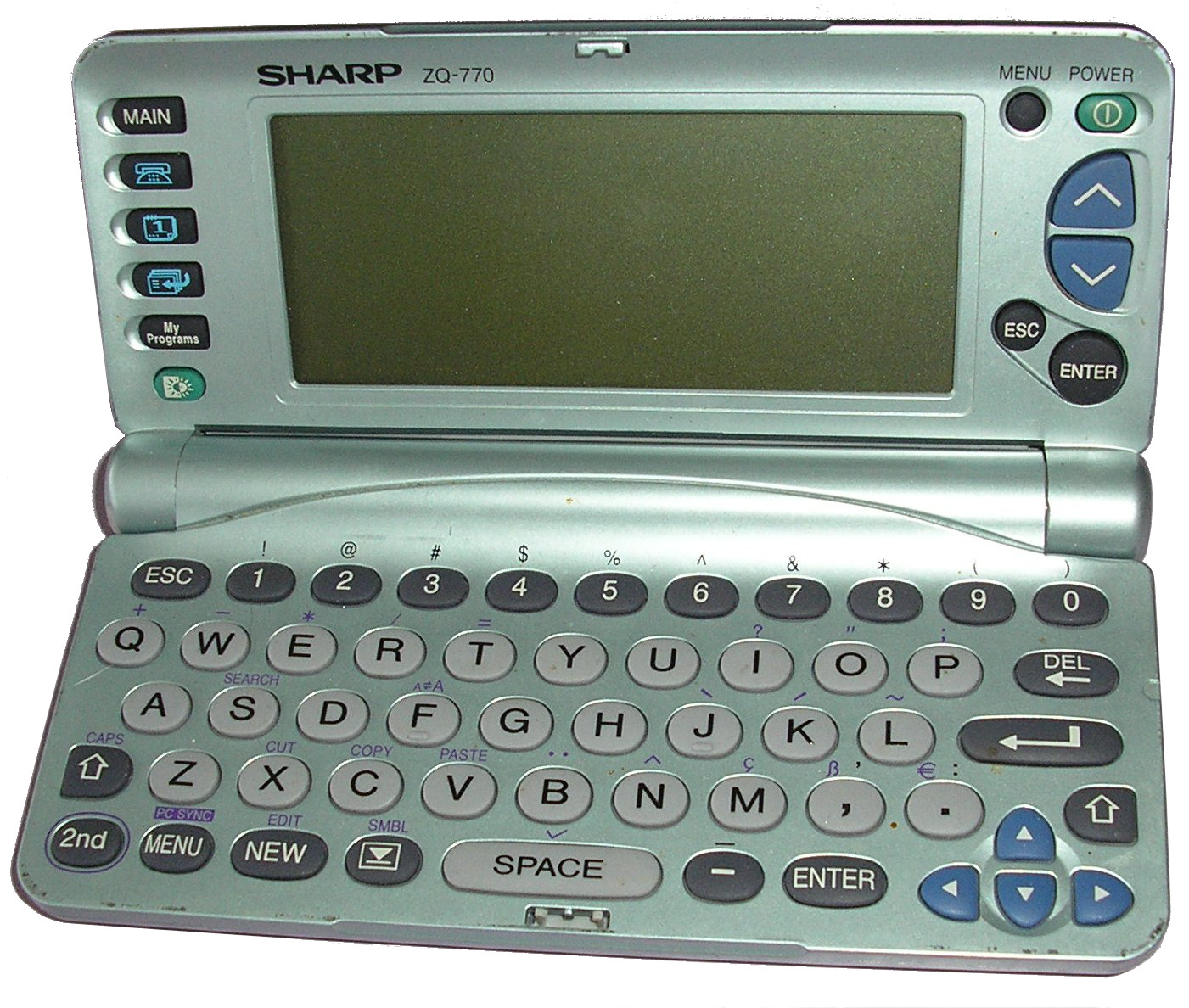
Opened Sharp Electric Organizer model (sold as Sharp Wizard in the US) model ZQ-770.

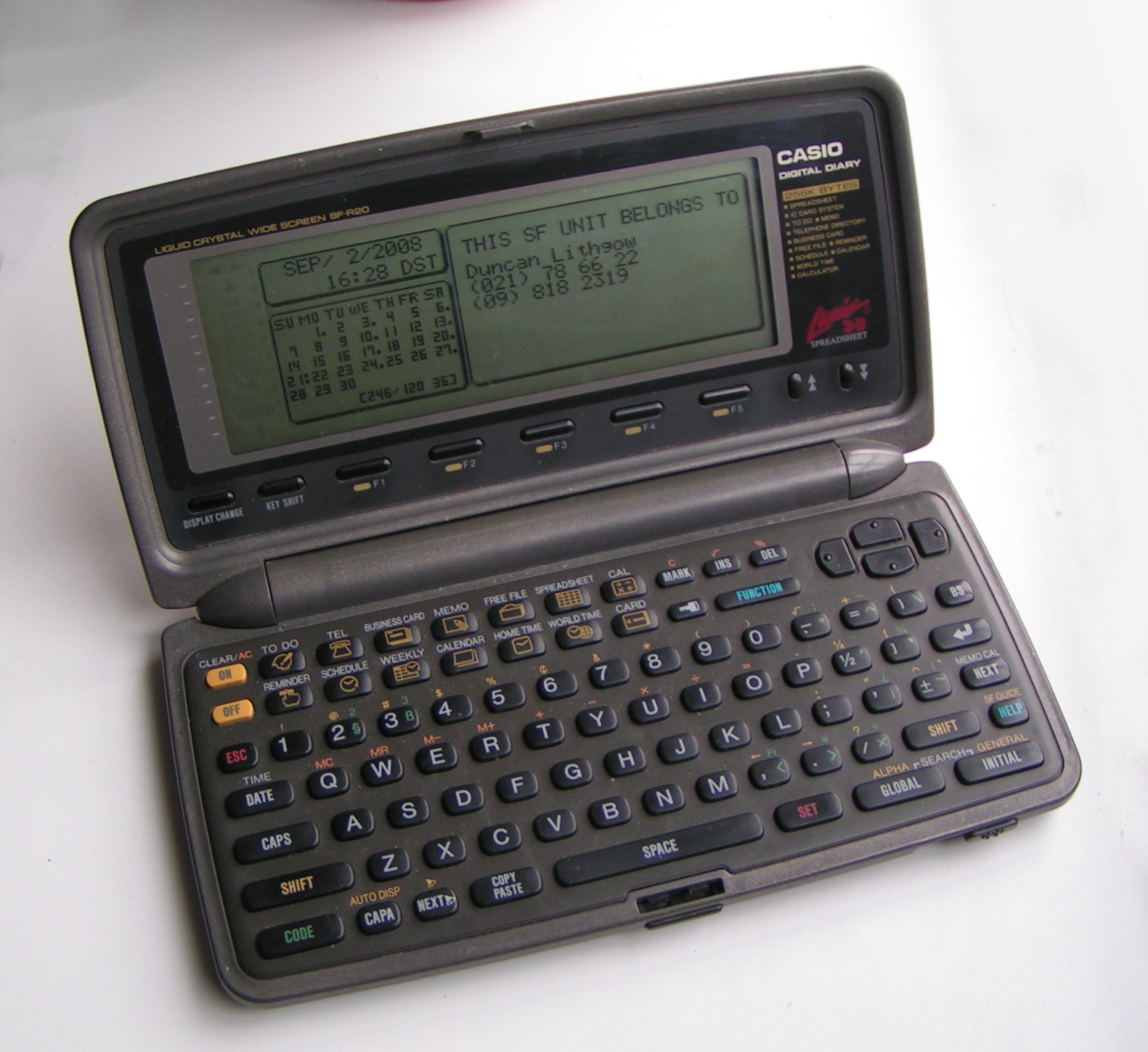
Casio SF-R20 Digital Diary featuring 256 KB RAM, from around 1993.

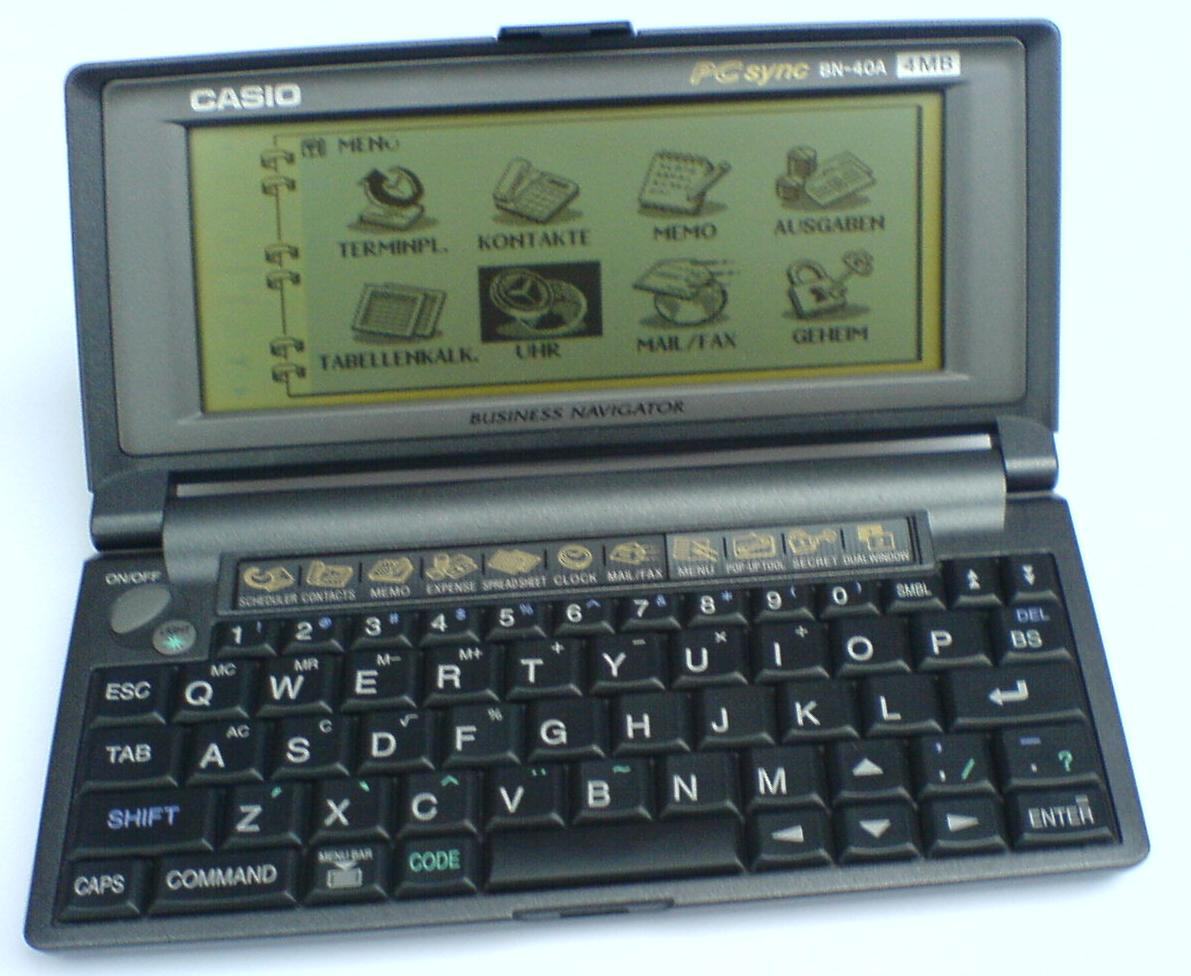
Casio Business Navigator BN-40A.

An electronic organizer (or electric organizer) is a small calculator-sized computer, often with a built-in diary application and other functions such as an address book and calendar, replacing paper-based personal organizers. Typically, it has a small alphanumeric keypad and an LCD screen of one, two, or three lines.

They were very popular especially with businessmen during the 1990s, but because of the advent of personal digital assistants and palmtop PCs later in the decade, as well as smartphones in the 2010s, all of which have a larger set of features, electronic organizers are mostly seen today for research purposes. One of the leading research topics being the study of how electronics can help people with mental disabilities use this type of equipment to aid their daily life. Electronic organizers have more recently been used to support people with Alzheimer's disease to have a visual representation of a schedule.

== History ==
The electronic diary or organizer was first patented by Indian businessman Satyanarayan Pitroda in 1975.

== Casio digital diary ==
Casio digital diaries were produced by Casio in the early and mid 1990s, but have since been entirely superseded by mobile phones and PDAs.

== Other electronic organizers ==
While Casio was a major role player in the field of electronic organizers there were many different ideas, patent requests, and manufacturers of electronic organizers. Rolodex, widely known for their index card holders in the 1980s, Sharp Electronics, mostly known for their printers and audio visual equipment, and lastly Royal electronics were all large contributors to the electronic organizer in its heyday.

=== Features ===
- Telephone directory
- Schedule keeper: Keep track of appointments.
- Memo function: Store text data such as price lists, airplane schedules, and more.
- To do list: Keep track of daily tasks, checking off items as you complete them.
- World time: Find out the current time in virtually any location on the globe.
- Secret memory area: The secret memory area keeps personal data private. Once a password is registered, data is locked away until the password is used to access the secret area.
- Alarm
- Metric conversion function: Conversion between metric units and another measurement unit.
- Currency conversion function
- Game: Some machines included a game such as Poker or Blackjack.

== See also ==
- Pocket electronic dictionary
- Personal digital assistant (PDA)
- Smartphone
- Pocket computer
