= PCMCIA =

Computing industry body

Personal Computer Memory Card International Association
- Merged into: USB Implementers Forum
- Founded: 1989; 37 years ago
- Founder: Ian H. S. Cullimore
- Defunct: 2009; 17 years ago
- Type: Non-profit industry consortium
- Products: Technical specifications of the PC Card and ExpressCard
- Website: pcmcia.org at the Wayback Machine (archived 2008-12-25)

The Personal Computer Memory Card International Association (PCMCIA) was an industry consortium of computer hardware manufacturers from 1989 to 2009. Starting with the PCMCIA card in 1990 (the name later simplified to PC Card), it created various standards for peripheral interfaces designed for laptop computers.

== History ==
PCMCIA was based on the original initiative of the British mathematician and computer scientist Ian H. S. Cullimore, one of the founders of the Sunnyvale-based Poqet Computer Corporation, who was seeking to integrate some kind of memory card technology as storage medium into their early MS-DOS-based palmtop PCs, when traditional floppy drives and harddisks were found to be too power-hungry and large to fit into their battery-powered handheld devices. When in July 1989, Poqet contacted Fujitsu for their existing but still non-standardized SRAM memory cards, and Intel for their flash technology, the necessity and potential of establishing a worldwide memory card standard became obvious to the parties involved. This led to the foundation of the PCMCIA organization in September 1989.

By early 1990, some thirty companies had joined the initiative already, including Poqet, Fujitsu, Intel, Mitsubishi, IBM, Lotus, Microsoft and SCM Microsystems (now Identiv).

From 1990 onwards, the association published and maintained a sequence of standards for parallel communication peripheral interfaces in laptop computers, notably the PCMCIA card, later renamed to PC Card, and succeeded by ExpressCard (2003), all of them now technologically obsolete.

The PCMCIA association was dissolved in 2009 and all of its activities have since been managed by the USB Implementers Forum, according to the PCMCIA website.

As of 2023, PCMCIA is now little used in new hardware, with most removable devices using USB instead. The Linux kernel project is now moving toward removing obsolete PCMCIA drivers from the mainline kernel.

== Name ==
PCMCIA stands for Personal Computer Memory Card International Association, the group of companies that defined the standard.

It has been described 'probably one of the most mocked acronyms of the industry'. This acronym was difficult to say and remember, and was sometimes jokingly referred to as "People Can't Memorize Computer Industry Acronyms". To recognize increased scope beyond memory, and to aid in marketing, the association acquired the rights to the simpler term "PC Card" from IBM. This was the name of the standard from version 2 of the specification onwards. These cards were used for wireless networks, modems, and other functions in notebook PCs.
