= Palmtop PC =

1990s small battery-powered computer

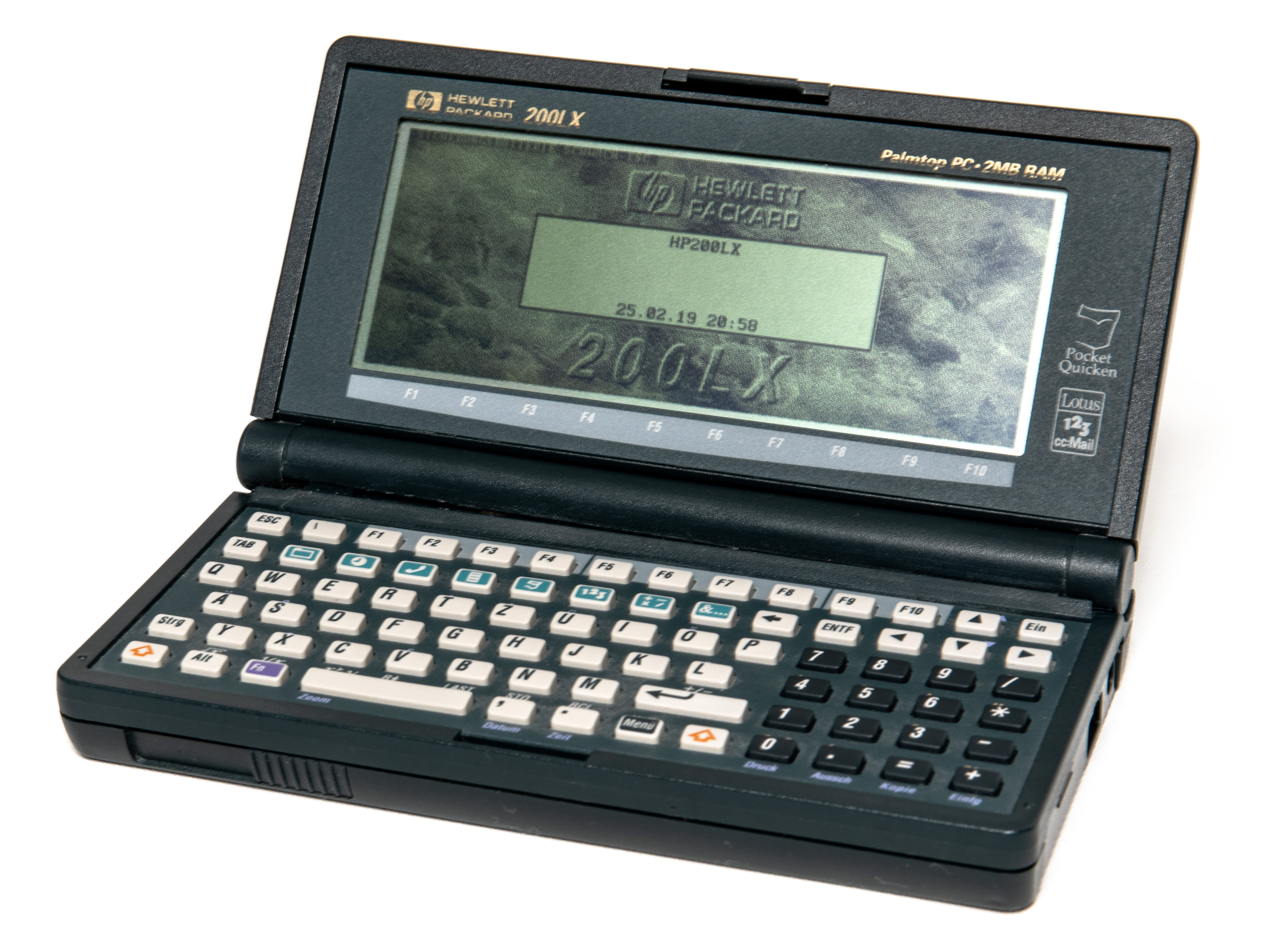
The 200LX, a popular Palmtop PC from Hewlett-Packard

A Palmtop PC is an obsolete, approximately pocket calculator-sized, battery-powered computer in a horizontal clamshell design with integrated keyboard and display. It could be used like a modern subnotebook, but was light enough to be comfortably used handheld as well. Most Palmtop PCs were small enough to be stored in a user's shirt or jacket pockets.

Palmtop PCs distinguish from other palmtop computers by using a mostly IBM-compatible PC architecture, and BIOS as well as an Intel-compatible x86 processor. All such devices were DOS-based, with DOS stored in ROM. While many Palmtop PCs came with a number of PDA and office applications pre-installed in ROM, most of them could also run generic, off-the-shelf PC software with no or little modifications. Some could also run other operating systems such as GEOS, Windows 1.0-3.0 (in Real mode only), or MINIX 2.0.

Most Palmtop PCs have been based on a static hardware design for low power consumption, and instant-on/off without the need to reboot. Depending on the model, the battery could power the device for a period ranging from several hours up to several days while running, or between a week and a year in standby mode. Combined with the instant-on/off feature, a battery would typically last from a week up to several months in practical use as PDA.

The first Palmtop PC was the DIP Pocket PC (aka Atari Portfolio) in 1989.

Palmtop PCs include:

- DIP Pocket PC (DIP DOS 2.11, 1989)
- Atari Portfolio (DIP DOS 2.11, 1989)
- Poqet PC Classic (MS-DOS 3.3, 80C88, 1989)
- Poqet PC Prime (MS-DOS 3.3, 80C88)
- Poqet PC Plus (MS-DOS 5.0, NEC V30)
- ZEOS Pocket PC (MS-DOS 5.0, 1991)
- Sharp PC-3000 (MS-DOS 3.3, 1991)
- Sharp PC-3100 (MS-DOS 3.3, 1991)
- Hewlett-Packard 95LX (MS-DOS 3.22, NEC V20, 1991)
- Hewlett-Packard 100LX (MS-DOS 5.0, 80186-compatible HP Hornet, 1993)
- Hewlett-Packard Palmtop FX (MS-DOS 5.0, 80186-compatible HP Hornet, 1993)
- Hewlett-Packard 200LX (MS-DOS 5.0, 80186-compatible HP Hornet, 1994)
- Hewlett-Packard 1000CX (MS-DOS 5.0, 80186-compatible HP Hornet)
- Hewlett-Packard OmniGo 700LX (MS-DOS 5.0, 80186-compatible HP Hornet, 1996)

Some touch-screen computers may also be included in this category:

- Hewlett-Packard OmniGo 100 (Datalight ROM-DOS+PEN/GEOS 2.1, NEC V30HL-compatible Vadem VG230, 1993)
- Hewlett-Packard OmniGo 120 (DOS+PEN/GEOS, NEC V30HL-compatible Vadem VG230)

== See also ==
- Sub-notebook, not necessarily IBM- and x86- compatible, clamshell design, but larger than Palmtop PCs
- Handheld PC, not necessarily IBM- and x86- compatible, various form factors
- Netbook (generic), IBM- and x86- compatible, legacy-free, clamshell design
- Ultra-mobile PC, a Microsoft specification (IBM- and x86- compatible, legacy-free, not necessarily clamshell design, touchscreen)
- netBook, StrongARM, clamshell design, touchscreen
- Pocket PC, a Microsoft specification (ARM-based, various form factors, touchscreen)
- PalmDOS
- Electronic organizer
- PDA (Personal Digital Assistant)
