= Sharp PC-3000 =

The Sharp PC-3000 was an MS-DOS-based palmtop computer introduced in late 1991 and shipped in volume in 1992. The "SPC" was designed and developed by DIP Research Ltd. ("DIP") in the UK. DIP had earlier designed the Atari Portfolio and the two machines shared many design features both in hardware and software.

== Features ==
As with desktop IBM PCs, this one-pound device's screen displayed 80-column 25 lines.

=== Peripherals ===
The machine was one of the first to support the PC card interface, at the time known as PCMCIA.

Printers, floppy drives, dial-up modems, Fax modems were among the supported peripheral devices.

=== System software ===
MS-DOS 3.3 is installed. It is possible to run Microsoft Windows 3.0 (running in real mode with a mouse), albeit quite slowly.

=== Application software ===
The machine came with a suite of built in applications providing a simple word processor, calculator and 1-2-3 compatible spreadsheet.

With some tweaking, it was also possible to run WordPerfect, Microsoft Word and Microsoft Excel.

== Sharp PC-3100 ==
A 2 MB model was produced: the 3100.
