= Poqet PC =

IBM PC compatible computer (c. 1989)

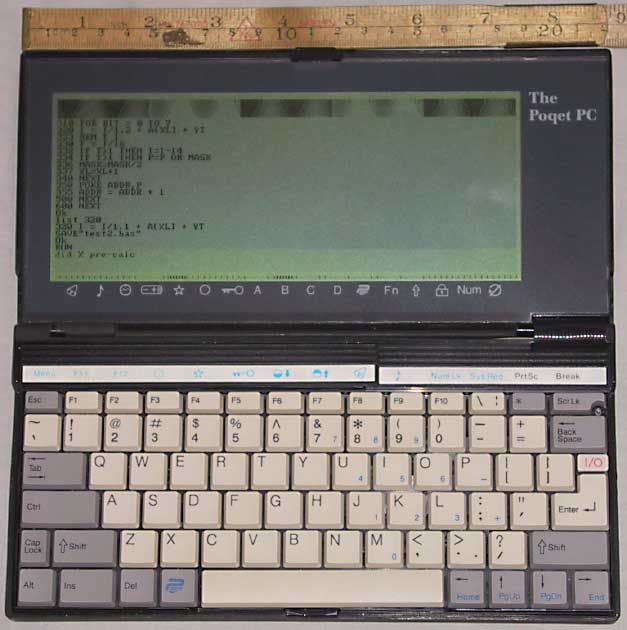
- An original Poqet PC
- Developer: Poqet Computer Corporation; Ian Cullimore; John P. Fairbanks; Leroy Harper; Shinpei Ichikcawa; Stav Prodromou
- Manufacturer: Poqet Computer Corporation
- Type: Palmtop PC
- Released: 1989; 37 years ago
- Lifespan: 1989–1994

The Poqet PC is a line of palmtop PCs introduced in 1989 by Poqet Computer Corporation. The eponymous first model was the first IBM PC–compatible palmtop computer capable of running MS-DOS at CGA resolutions. The Poqet PC is powered by two AA batteries. Through the use of aggressive power management, which includes stopping the CPU between keystrokes, the batteries are able to power the computer for anywhere between a couple of weeks and a couple of months, depending on usage. The computer also uses an "instant on" feature, such that after powering it down, it can be used again immediately without having to go through a full booting sequence. The Poqet PC is comparable to the HP 95LX/HP 100LX/HP 200LX and the Atari Portfolio handheld computers. The computer originally sold for US$2,000; it was discontinued after Fujitsu Ltd. bought Poqet Computer Corp.

== Poqet PC, "Classic" and Prime ==
Three variants were produced. The Poqet PC was the first to be introduced and the Poqet PC Prime followed shortly after. (The original version was subsequently renamed the Poqet PC "Classic"). Several years later, the Poqet PC Plus was introduced. The main difference between the Poqet PC Classic and the Prime was the expansion of RAM from 512 to 640 KB and enhancement of the power management features.

=== Specifications ===
- Size: 8.8 in (220 mm) x 4.3 in (110 mm) x 1 in (25 mm)
- Weight: 1.2 lb (0.54 kg) with batteries
- Battery life: 50–100 hours (expect a lot less if running long, CPU-intensive programs (10-20 h approx.))
- Microprocessor: Intel 80C88 / 7 MHz
- Memory: 640 KB SRAM
- Display: Reflective DSTN (no backlight)
- Display compatibility: MDA: 80 × 25 characters
  CGA: 640 × 200 pixels
- PCMCIA: 2 × Type I, Revision 1.0 memory card slots
- Secondary storage: Drive A: 512 KB-2 MB PCMCIA (not included)
  Drive B: 512-2 MB PCMCIA (not included)
  Drive C: 768 KB ROM drive with MS-DOS 3.3 and PoqetTools
  Drive D: 22 KB volatile RAM drive
- Built-in software: MS-DOS 3.3, PoqetLink, and PoqetTools

== Poqet PC Plus ==
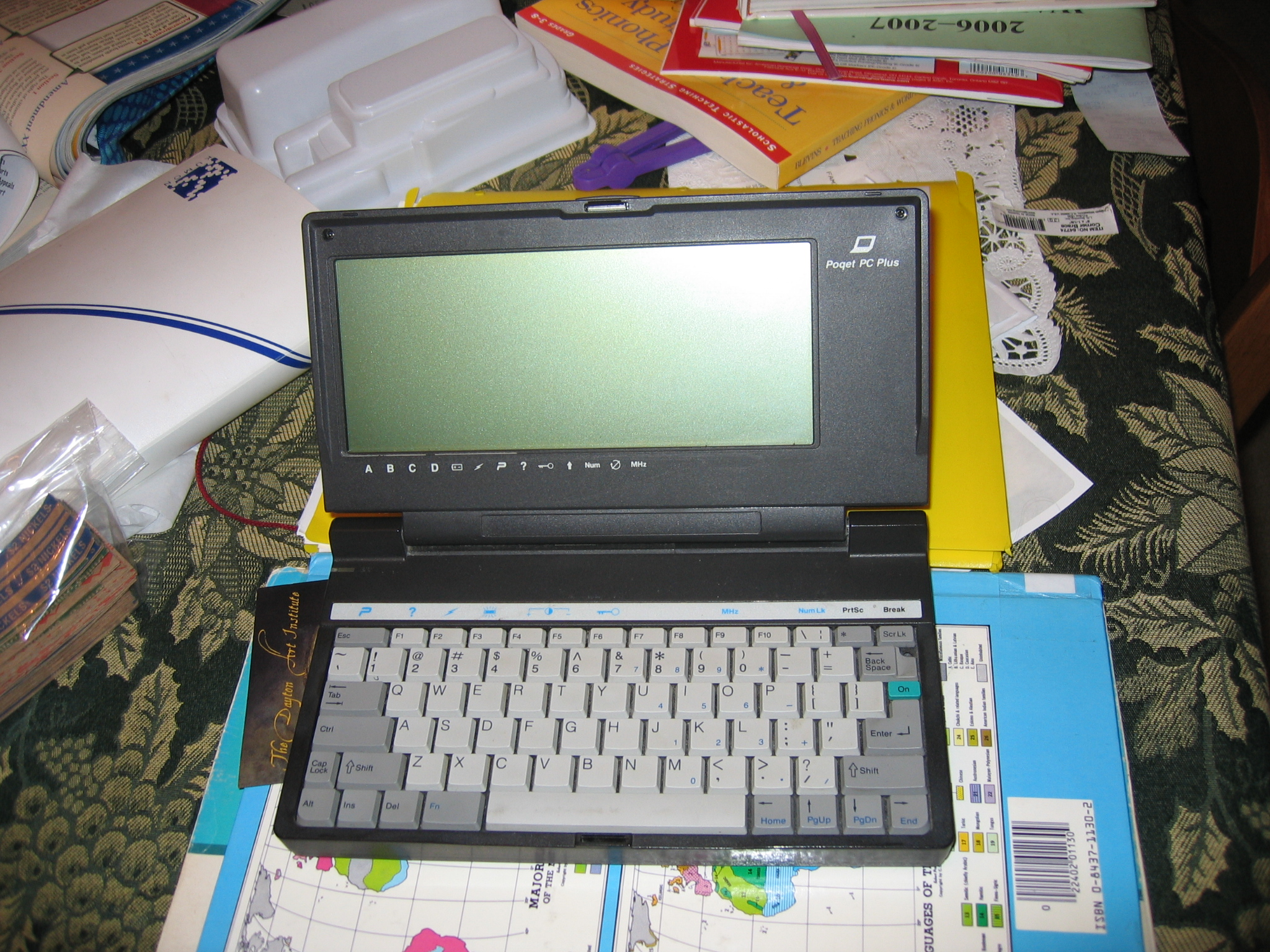
Poqet PC Plus

Several years after the Poqet Prime and Classic, and some time after Fujitsu purchased Poqet Computer Corp., the new and improved Poqet PC Plus was introduced. The Poqet PC Plus had significant differences from the Classic and Prime models, some better than others. It features a rechargeable battery pack that holds a smaller charge than the "Classic", enhanced PC Card slots that now support more PC Cards, a transflective backlit LCD and 2 MB of RAM (640 KB to DOS, 64 KB shadow, and 1-1344 KB for a RAM disk). The Poqet "Classic"'s LCD didn't have a backlight and was more prone to breaking than the Poqet PC Plus. It also only took Type I, Release 1.0 SRAM cards, as opposed to Type II cards and Release 2.0 cards, including flash, SRAM, and a few modem cards. The Plus also had more memory. Despite many improvements, the Plus also had its drawbacks. The Poqet PC Plus was considerably larger and heavier than its predecessors. It weighed approximately 1.83 lb (0.83 kg) as opposed to the Classic's 1.2 lb (0.54 kg). It also has a very odd miniature 26-pin serial connector for which there is no currently available adapter. However, many Toshiba external floppy drives and dongles used this same JAE connector. An amateur radio hobbyist who uses a Poqet has found a way to make a suitable adapter. It also is not totally PCMCIA Release 2.0 compatible, so not all memory cards will work, and, as Bryan Mason says on his Poqet site, only the "PNB Samantha modem, Megahertz 14.4 kbit/s modem with XJACK, and the AT&T Paradyne KeepInTouch 14.4 kbit/s modems" will work in it. In addition, not all CompactFlash cards work in the Poqet. Users have found that many machines do not work with newer CF cards.

=== Specifications ===
- Size: 9.05 in (230 mm) x 5.12 in (130 mm) x 1.42 in (36 mm)
- Weight: 1.54 lb (0.70 kg) w/batteries
- Battery life: 3–12 hours (application dependent)
- Microprocessor: NEC V30 at 16 MHz
- Memory: 2 MB (Memory above 640 KB is configurable as EMS or a RAM disk. 64 KB is reserved for shadow BIOS.)
- Display: Transflective LCD with backlight on demand. 7.25 in (184 mm) diagonal size.
- Display compatibility: MDA: 80 x 25 characters
  CGA: 640 x 200 pixels
- Expansion: 2 × Type II PCMCIA slots (nearly compatible with PCMCIA Revision 2.0.)
  1 × TTL serial port
  1 × TTL/RS-232 serial port (configurable)
  - PCMCIA Compatibility: Supports SunDisk (SanDisk) ATA Flash, 3.3 V and 5 V SRAM; AT&T Paradyne KeepInTouch modem, Megahertz PCMCIA 14.4 kbit/s modem with XJACK, and PNB Samantha modem.
- Secondary storage: Drive A: Left PCMCIA slot
  Drive B: Right PCMCIA slot
  Drive C: ROM drive with MS-DOS 5.0
  Drive D: 784 KB Flash drive
  Drive E: RAM drive (if configured)
- Built-in software: MS-DOS 5.0, EMS driver, RAM Disk driver, Flash utility, barcode reader, PenConnect serial communications software, PCMCIA driver.

== Reception ==
The Poqet PC was one of the first subnotebooks to exist in the marketplace, and still today is one of the smallest, although it is beaten by the HP 200LX. It was immediately recognized as a milestone in portable computing when PC Magazine awarded the Poqet PC development team (Ian H. S. Cullimore, John P. Fairbanks, Leroy D. Harper, Shinpei Ichikawa, Stavro Evangelo Prodromou) its coveted Technical Excellence Award for 1989. The same device that PC World called "one of the 50 greatest gadgets of the last 50 years" had a very short lifespan, from only about 1989 to 1994. After Poqet was bought by Fujitsu, the Poqet was soon axed. For a short time Poqet value declined, with the onset of Windows CE. A similar decline in HP 200LX demand also occurred after the introduction of HP Windows CE machines. However, despite the new machines' power, their operating system soon proved to be inefficient. The Poqets and HP 'LX' DOS machines became very sought-after. Poqets also are in fairly high demand, but fetch somewhat lower prices. A Cherry Hill, NJ business, Disks 'n' Data, once had a stock of Classics and Pluses. As the owner of the store, Jerry Tessler, put it: "I sold them all in twenty minutes." Unlike running Windows CE, running DOS in near-standard specifications meant that everything from Lotus 1-2-3 to Zork worked as expected.

== See also ==
- Zeos Pocket PC
- HP 1000CX
- HP OmniGo 700LX
- Toshiba Libretto
- Fujitsu Lifebook

== Works cited ==
- California Digital. 2006. 2006-12-22.
- Mason, Bryan. The Poqet PC Home Page. 2006. 2006-12-25.
- Poqet PC Plus Serial Adapter. 2005. 2006-12-22.
- Wong, Al. Al's Review of Fujitsu's Poqet PC Plus. 2001. 2006-12-23.
