= Zeos Pocket PC =

1992 palmtop PC

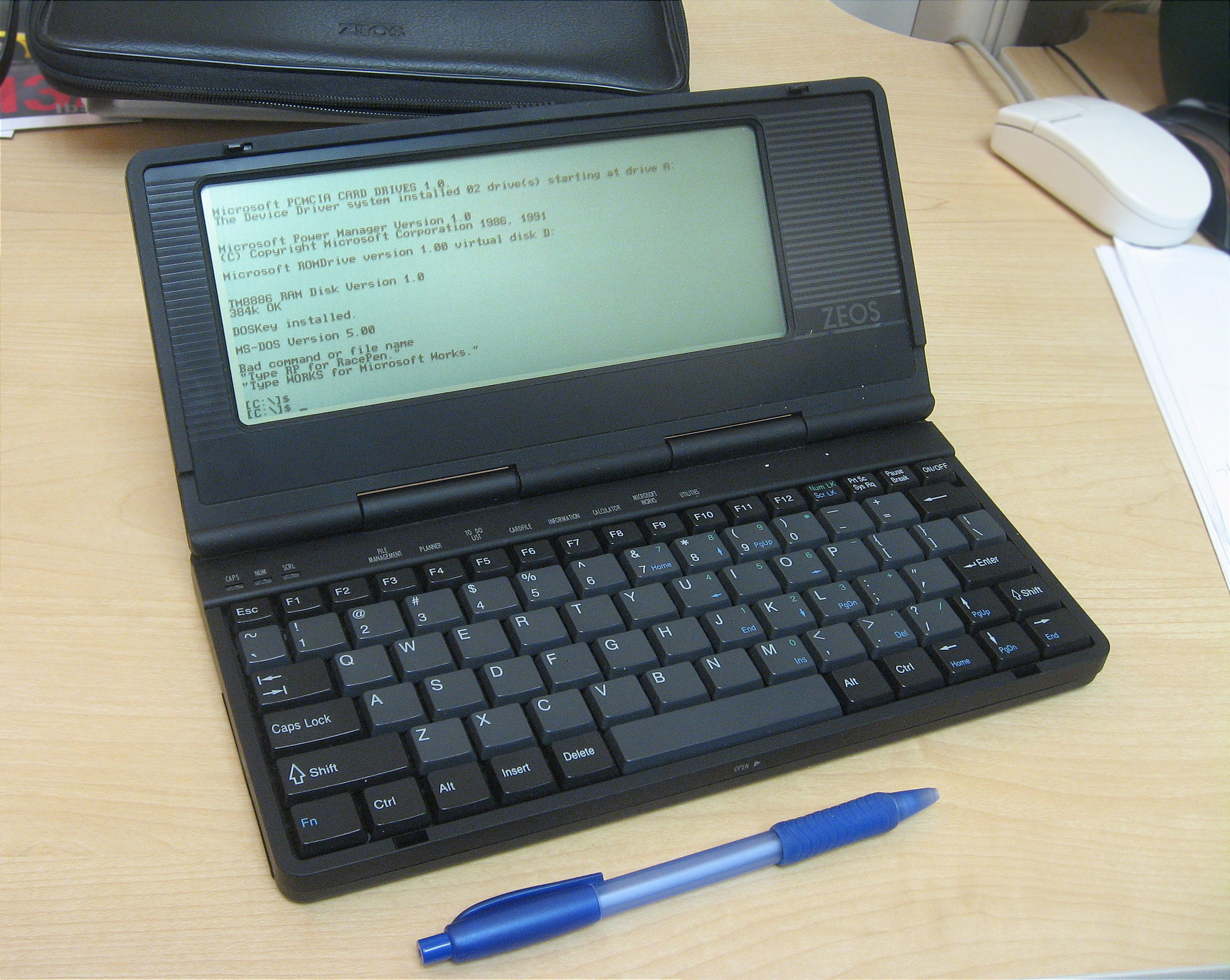
- The Zeos Pocket PC, pictured next to its original carrying case and a ballpoint pen (for scale)
- Developer: Tidalwave Microtech
- Manufacturer: Tidalwave Microtech
- Type: Palmtop PC
- Released: June 1992; 33 years ago
- CPU: NEC V30 at 7.15 MHz
- Memory: 1 MB RAM

The Zeos Pocket PC is a palmtop PC marketed by Zeos International beginning in 1992. The palmtop features an NEC V30 clocked at 7.15 MHz, came shipped with MS-DOS 5.0 in ROM, and has a monochrome LCD capable of displaying graphics at maximum resolution of 640×200 (CGA). These features make the Pocket PC compatible with most IBM PC software out at the time of its release. The Pocket PC is a badge-engineered version of the Tidalwave PS-1000, manufactured by Tidalwave Microtech of Taiwan. It sought to compete with the Poqet PC, another PC-compatible palmtop computer.

== Development and specifications ==
David Chen founded Tidalwave Microtech in Taiwan as a manufacturer of palmtop PCs in the early 1990s. In 1991, they sold their first products, generating US$4 million in sales. In March 1992, they introduced the Tidalwave PS-1000, exclusively in Europe.

The PS-1000 was compatible with most contemporary IBM PC software, running an NEC V30 microprocessor clocked at 7.15 MHz (roughly on-par with Intel's Intel 8086). It came shipped with a copy of MS-DOS 5.0 in ROM, as well as Microsoft Works 2.0, Lotus 1-2-3 2.2, and an application selector called RacePen. The computer measures 245 by 112 by 25 millimetres (9.65 by 4.41 by 0.98 in) and features a transflective monochrome LCD, measuring 7 inches by 2.75 inches and capable of displaying graphics at maximum resolution of 640×200 (CGA) across 16 shades of gray. The computer sports 640 KB of system RAM; two application ROMs (one 512 KB ROM for DOS and one 1 MB ROM for the bundled applications); one 384-KB RAM disk; and 32-KB of SRAM-based video RAM. The system offers a serial port, a parallel port, and one Type I PC Card slot for external data storage and other peripherals. However, no external floppy drive was offered to transfer files to and from larger desktop computers via sneakernet; a direct serial connection was required for that. The serial and parallel ports are concealed behind a snap-on plastic door to prevent dust intrusion. Two AA batteries are all that is needed to power the PS-1000, providing a battery life of roughly 10 hours. Tidalwave sought to compete with Fujitsu's Poqet PC, from which the PS-1000 borrows its basic form factor and many of the Poqet PC's stylings.

In the summer of 1992, Zeos acquired the rights from Tidalwave to rebadge the PS-1000 as the Zeos Pocket PC in the United States. Somewhat later, Sharper Image also signed a contract with Tidalwave to resell the PS-1000 as the Sharper Image Palmtop PC. In Germany, Tidalwave agreed to manufacture palmtops for Vobis, the latter reselling them as the Highscreen Handy Organizer. Zeos shipped the Pocket PC with a carrying case, an AC adaptor, serial cables to connect to a desktop computer, and LapLink software to establish the aforementioned serial connections.

== Reception ==
The American Computer Shopper's Eric Grevstad called the Zeos Pocket PC the best PC in the handheld size class: "Taken on its own terms of power, portability, and affordability, it's a remarkable little computer". Michael Nadeau of Byte called the Zeos Pocket PC superior to Fujitsu's Poqet PC in terms of value and the design of its keyboard. He appreciated the rubberized coating of the case and found RacePen well-designed and intuitive to use for newcomers. Robert E. Calem, also writing in Byte, called the computer closer to an electronic organizer à la the Sharp Wizard than a proper personal computer but appreciated the wide keyboard. The UPI writer William M. Reilly found the Zeos Pocket PC usable in a number of different environments and ended up preferring it to his desktop computer. In PC World, Robert Lauriston wrote that the Zeos Pocket PC was the first palmtop PC that users could touch-type on, albeit still "slightly cramped". Michael Urlocker of the National Post concurred: "The Pocket PC keyboard was significantly better for touch-typing than any of the other machines because its keys were marginally larger and didn't have the chiclet feel of so many portables".

On the other hand, Russell Letson of Home Office Computing gave the Zeos Pocket PC one-and-a-half out of four stars, finding the LCD and keyboard too lackluster to overlook and some of the plastics flimsy, especially the port door covering the serial and parallel ports. Reviewing the Zeos Pocket PC in PC Magazine, Greg Pastrick called the machine an "exercise in compromise" that was let down by its expensive external memory cards and lack of a Type II PC Card slot that would have allowed the palmtop to accommodate an internal modem. He found the built-in applications adequate and the display readable in optimal lighting conditions. Brit Hume of The Washington Post called the lack of conventional external storage and the non-backlit nature of the LCD drawbacks to the machine.

== Legacy and successors ==
The Zeos Pocket PC was discontinued by June 1993, replaced by the Zeos Contenda, a larger subnotebook computer. Tidalwave continued developing updates models of the PS-1000, partnering with United Microelectronics Corporation (UMC) between 1992 and 1993 to design systems-on-a-chip for palmtop PCs, combining Tidalwave's chipset core for the PS-1000 and UMC's cores for their 80286, i386, and i486 clone processors.

In December 1992, Tidalwave previewed the PS-3000, running a NEC V30HL processor clocked faster than the original V30, but roughly identical to the original PS-1000 in terms of capability and form factor. Tidalwave partnered with Prolinear Corporation, based in the City of Industry, California, to resell the PS-3000 in the United States as the Prolinear Palmtop PC. The Prolinear Palmtop PC received a substantial hardware upgrade when it was released in the spring of 1993, sporting an AMD 386SX-LV clocked at 25 MHz. Prolinear continued selling their Palmtop PC into at least 1995.

== See also ==
- Atari Portfolio
- Gateway HandBook
