= MobilePro =

Line of personal digital assistants by NEC

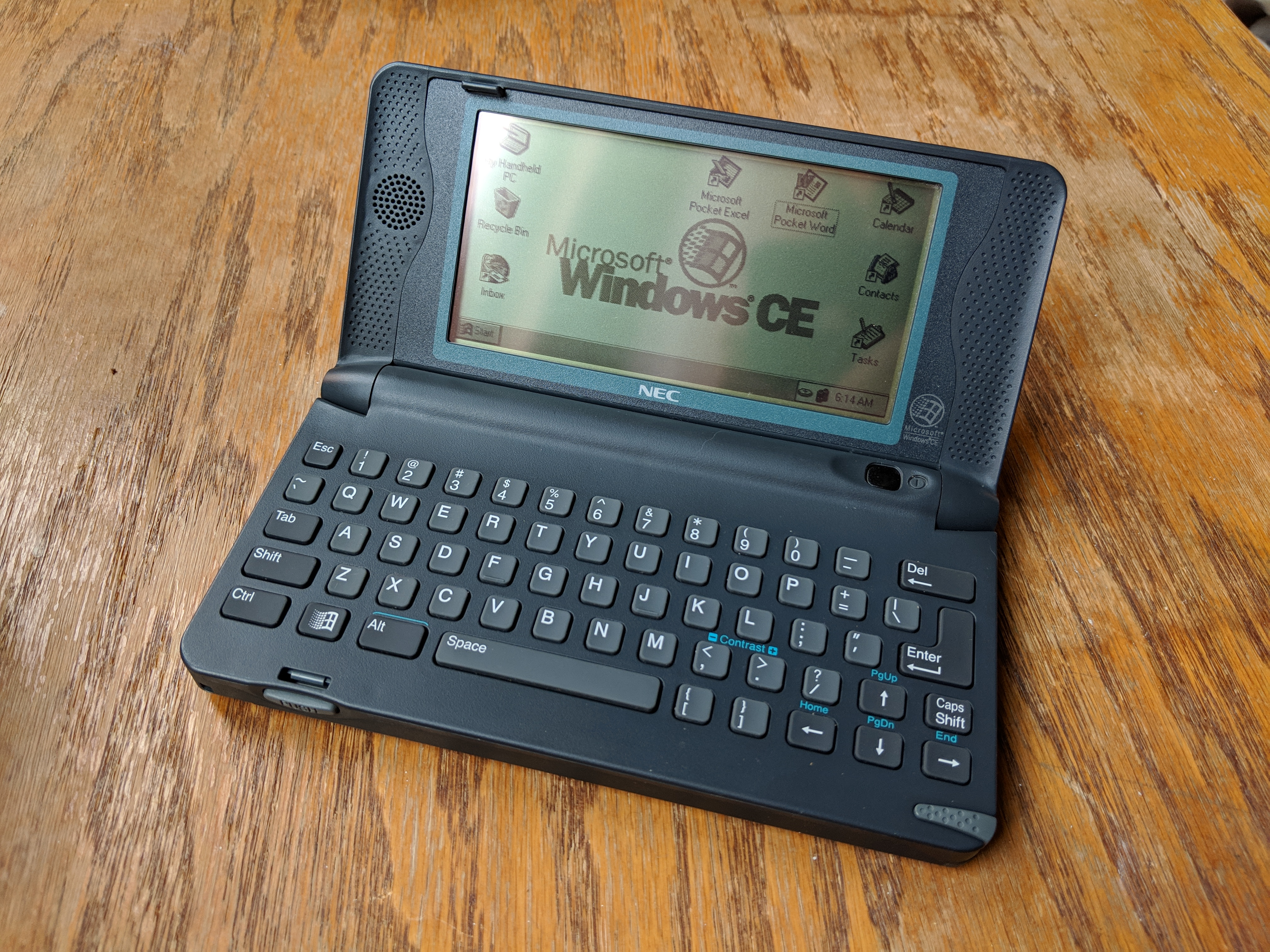
- MobilePro 400
- Developer: NEC
- Manufacturer: NEC
- Type: Handheld PC; Personal digital assistant (Pocket PC)
- Released: November 1996; 30 years ago
- Lifespan: 1996–2004
- Discontinued: 2004; 22 years ago
- CPU: Various; see § Models

The MobilePro is a discontinued line of personal digital assistants manufactured by NEC. Most models in the MobilePro range were handheld PCs with almost full size keyboards and a compact form placing them between being a palmtop and a subnotebook. All of the models in the MobilePro range ran a version of Microsoft's Windows CE mobile operating system and could be navigated using a stylus and touchscreen.

== Models ==
=== MobilePro 200 ===
The MobilePro 200 was the first system released under MobilePro brand in November 1996. It featured a non-backlit 480 x 240 four-colour grayscale display and a type II PC Card slot. It had 2 MB of RAM and a NEC VR4101 MIPS microprocessor and ran Windows CE 1.0. It could be synced to a PC via a docking cradle or could communicate with other handheld PCs via an infrared port. The unit is powered by a pair of AA batteries. The MobilePro 200 also has numerous organizer software features as well as numerous entertainment software (Solitaire) This unit is touchscreen and does not require the use of a mouse.

=== MobilePro 400 ===
The MobilePro 400 was released simultaneously with the MobilePro 200 as a higher-end model in November 1996. It had 4 MB of RAM and a NEC VR4101 MIPS processor. It came with Windows CE 1.0 but could be upgraded to Windows CE 2.0. The MobilePro 400 has Pocket Word, Excel and PowerPoint. Like the MobilePro 200 before it, it runs on two AA batteries which last about a month.

=== MobilePro 450 ===
The MobilePro 450 was released in June 1997. It was virtually identical to the 200 and 400 but introduced a backlight display and had more memory.

=== MobilePro 700 ===
The MobilePro 700 was released in November 1997. The design was significant change from earlier models with an 8.1 inch diagonal HVGA 640 x 240 display and removed the need for a docking cradle. It added a VGA port, a 33.6K modem, a compact flash slot and an internal microphone. It had 8 MB of RAM, Windows CE 2.0 and a 54 MHz NEC VR4102 MIPS processor.

=== MobilePro 750c ===
The MobilePro 750 was released in May 1998. It was the first MobilePro to feature a 256 colour display. It had 16 MB of RAM, Windows CE 2.0 and an NEC VR4111 80 MHz processor. The MobilePro 750c is the rarest MobilePro on the market.

=== MobilePro 770 ===
The MobilePro 770 was released in January 1999. It added a 4096 colour display and a 56K modem. It had 32 MB of RAM, Windows CE 2.11 and a 131 MHz NEC VR4121 MIPS processor.

=== MobilePro 800 ===
The MobilePro 800 was released in March 1999. It had specifications similar to the 770, but had a larger 9 inch 800 x 600 display and a USB port.

=== MobilePro 780 ===
The MobilePro 780 was released in January 2000. It had an 8.1 inch 640 x 240 64K colour display, 32 MB of RAM, Windows CE 2.11 and a 168 MHz NEC VR4121 processor.

=== MobilePro 880 ===
The MobilePro 880 was released in April 2000. It had specifications similar to the 780 but had a larger 9 inch 800 x 600 display and a USB port. The 790's ROM can be put in an 880 which upgrades the OS to CE 3 but disables the USB port.

=== MobilePro 790 ===
The MobilePro 790 was released in June 2001. It is an upgrade of the 780 that runs Windows for Handheld PC 2000.

=== MobilePro P300 ===
The MobilePro P300 was released in January 2002. It was NEC's first personal digital assistant, specifically a Pocket PC device; as such, unlike the rest of the MobilePro range, the P300 had no keyboard. It had a Compact Flash card slot and an SD card slot. It had 32 MB of RAM, a 206 MHz Intel StrongARM processor and ran Windows Pocket PC 2002.

=== MobilePro 900 ===
Released in May 2003.

Specifications

OS: Windows CE 3.0 / Handheld PC 2000

Bundled applications: Pocket Word, Excel, Access, PowerPoint, Internet Explorer, Windows Media Player, Microsoft Voice recorder, World Clock, Calculator, Solitaire, Terminal, ActiveSync, Remote Networking, Terminal Server Client

CPU: 400 MHz Intel XScale PXA255

Memory: 64 MB RAM SDRAM / 64 MB Flash ROM (32 MB for user applications and data)

Display: 8.1 inch HVGA (640 x 240) display

I/O interfaces: 56 kbit/s V.90 modem

USB ports

Serial port

PC Card Type I/II slot

Compact Flash Type I/II slot

Infrared (Fast IR)

Dimensions: 9.7 x 8.25 x 1.2 in.

Weight: under 2 lbs. (with standard battery)

=== MobilePro 900c ===
The MobilePro 900c was released in 2004. It had similar specifications to the 900 but ran Windows CE .NET 4.2 and could support using mass storage devices.

== See also ==
- Jornada, a competing line of devices from Hewlett-Packard
- Clio, another competing device by Vadem
