= Morrow Pivot =

1985 personal computer

Pivot
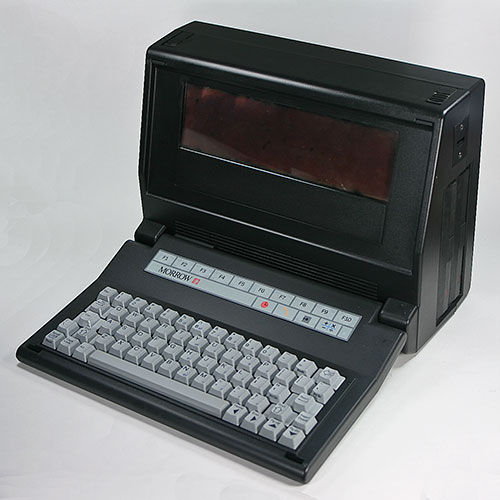
- A Morrow Pivot from 1984
- Developer: Morrow Designs; Vadem
- Type: Portable computer
- Released: November 1984; 41 years ago
- Introductory price: US$2,995 (equivalent to $9,060 in 2024)
- Operating system: MS-DOS 2.11
- CPU: 8088
- Memory: 256 KB (expandable to 640 KB) RAM; 32 KB ROM
- Display: 10-inch monochrome LCD
- Graphics: 80×16 lines, 480×128 pixels (Pivot I); 80×25 lines, 640×200 pixels (Pivot II)
- Weight: 13 pounds (5.9 kg)

The Pivot is a family of early IBM PC–compatible portable computers first released in 1984 by Morrow Designs, a company founded by George Morrow. It was the first lunchbox-style portable computer, with a vertically configured case that had a fold-down keyboard. The only external component was a single AC adapter. It would have been a little top heavy except for the large camcorder-style battery loaded into its base. The Pivot was designed by Chikok Shing of Vadem Inc.

The IBM-compatible Pivot was Morrow's first non-Z80 machine. While modern laptops do not necessarily share its design, it was arguably the most practical machine until desktops embraced 3.5-inch floppies.

== Specifications ==
The original model, retrospectively called the Pivot I, was unveiled at COMDEX/Spring '84 in May 1984 and released in November that year. The Pivot I has one 5.25-inch floppy drive, 256 KB of RAM, and an LCD capable of displaying bitmapped graphics at an abridged resolution of 480 by 128 pixels or text at 80 columns by 16 lines. Because these resolutions were smaller than standard CGA, a pop-up TSR utility built into ROM allows the user to scroll the screen in the four cardinal directions dynamically, while a program is running. Instead of sculpted plastic keys for the ten F-keys, these keys are located on a membrane keypad, with four additional photographic keys corresponding to different TSR utilities. These include the calculator button, which loads a calculator app; a clock button, which loads a clock/calendar app; a phone button, which loads a modem utility for terminal emulation; and a floppy icon, which either boots the floppy currently loaded into drive A or starts the aforementioned screen-scrolling utility.

The Pivot I had an original list price of US$2,995. In February 1985, Morrow revised the LCD to have an electroluminescent backlighting panel, allowing users to operate the computer in the dark. With this adjustment, the Morrow Pivot became the first battery-powered portable computer with a backlit display.

The Pivot II, introduced in May 1985, improved the LCD to support native CGA resolutions—that is, 320 by 200 pixels in graphics mode and 80 columns by 25 lines in text mode. The Pivot II was optioned with either one or two 5.25-inch floppy drives. In March 1986, Morrow introduced the Pivot XT, including an internal 3.5-inch, 10-MB hard disk drive in addition to two 5.25-inch floppy drives.

== Clones ==
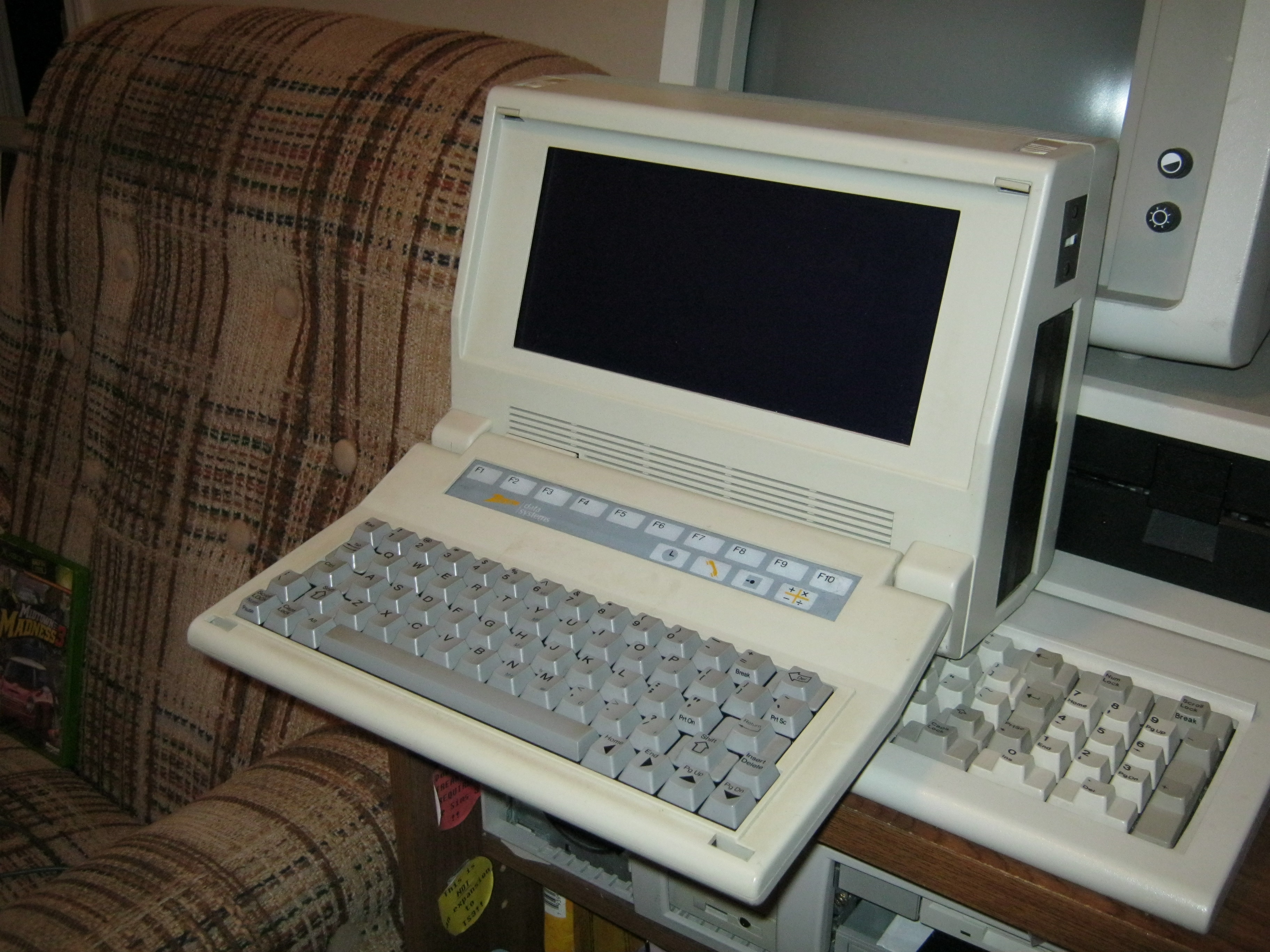
The Zenith Data Systems Z-171, a clone of the Pivot II licensed from Morrow

The Pivot II design was licensed to Zenith Data Systems in February 1985 for $1.5 million and sold as the Zenith Z-171. Zenith sold over US$27 million worth of ZFL-171s to the United States government, mainly to the Internal Revenue Service—notably beating out IBM and their PC Convertible clamshell laptop. In 1985 the general manager of Morrow Designs, Robert Dilworth, left his position to become CEO of Zenith Data Systems, a position he held for several years as part of Zenith's paying him to talk George Morrow into licensing the Pivot to them.

Osborne Computer Corporation licensed the original Pivot (not backlit, 80x16 line/480x128 display, 128 KB RAM, 16 KB ROM) from 1984 as the basis for their Osborne 3, known as the Osborne Encore in Europe.

== See also ==
- Sharp PC-7000, a later lunchbox portable PC, released in 1985 and also designed by Vadem
