= Easy peasy =

Easy peasy may refer to:

- EasyPeasy, a discontinued a Linux-based operating system for netbooks
- Abe Mosseri (born 1974), an American professional poker player also known by his online alias EazyPeazy
- Zenith Eazy PC, an all-in-one computer marketed by Zenith Data Systems in 1987
