= Sharp PC-4500 =

1987 laptop computer by Sharp Electronics

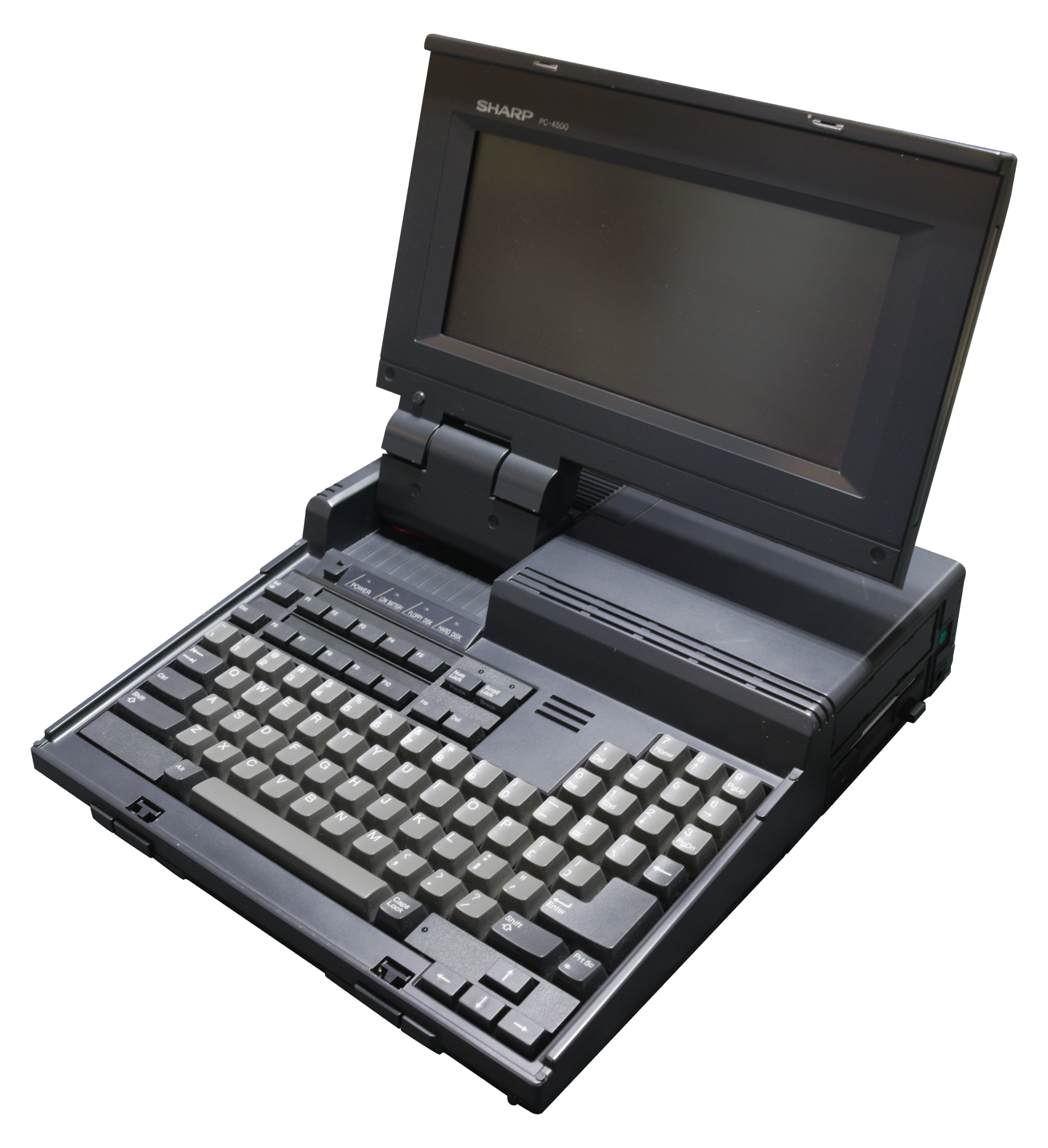
- Sharp PC-4521
- Developer: Sharp Corporation; Vadem Inc.
- Manufacturer: Sharp Corporation
- Type: Laptop
- Released: October 1987
- Units shipped: Over 26,000
- Media: 3.5-inch floppy disk
- Operating system: MS-DOS 2.11 or 3.21
- CPU: NEC V40 at 4.77/7.16 MHz
- Memory: 640 KB
- Storage: 20 MB hard disk drive (optional)
- Removable storage: 768 KB ROM card (optional)
- Display: Monochrome STN LCD
- Graphics: CGA, 640 × 200 px
- Dimensions: 12.2 by 3 by 13.7 inches (31.0 cm × 7.6 cm × 34.8 cm)
- Weight: 12.77 pounds (5.79 kg)
- Predecessor: Sharp PC-7000
- Successor: Sharp PC-4600

The Sharp PC-4500 is a line of laptop computers released by Sharp Corporation in 1987. The line comprises the PC-4501, the PC-4502, and the PC-4521. The PC-4501 is a bare-bones unit with only 256 KB of RAM stock, only one floppy drive, no backlighting, and no built-in numeric keypad; the PC-4502 and PC-4521 bumps the stock RAM to 640 KB and includes the latter two features while providing either two floppy drive (PC-4502) or one floppy drive and a 20 MB hard drive (PC-4521). Prices on the line initially ranged from $1,295 to just under $3,000; the PC-4501 was later sold for $995, becoming one of the first sub-$1,000 laptops available on the market. The PC-4500 line received mixed, mostly positive, reviews on its release in October 1987.

== Development and specifications ==
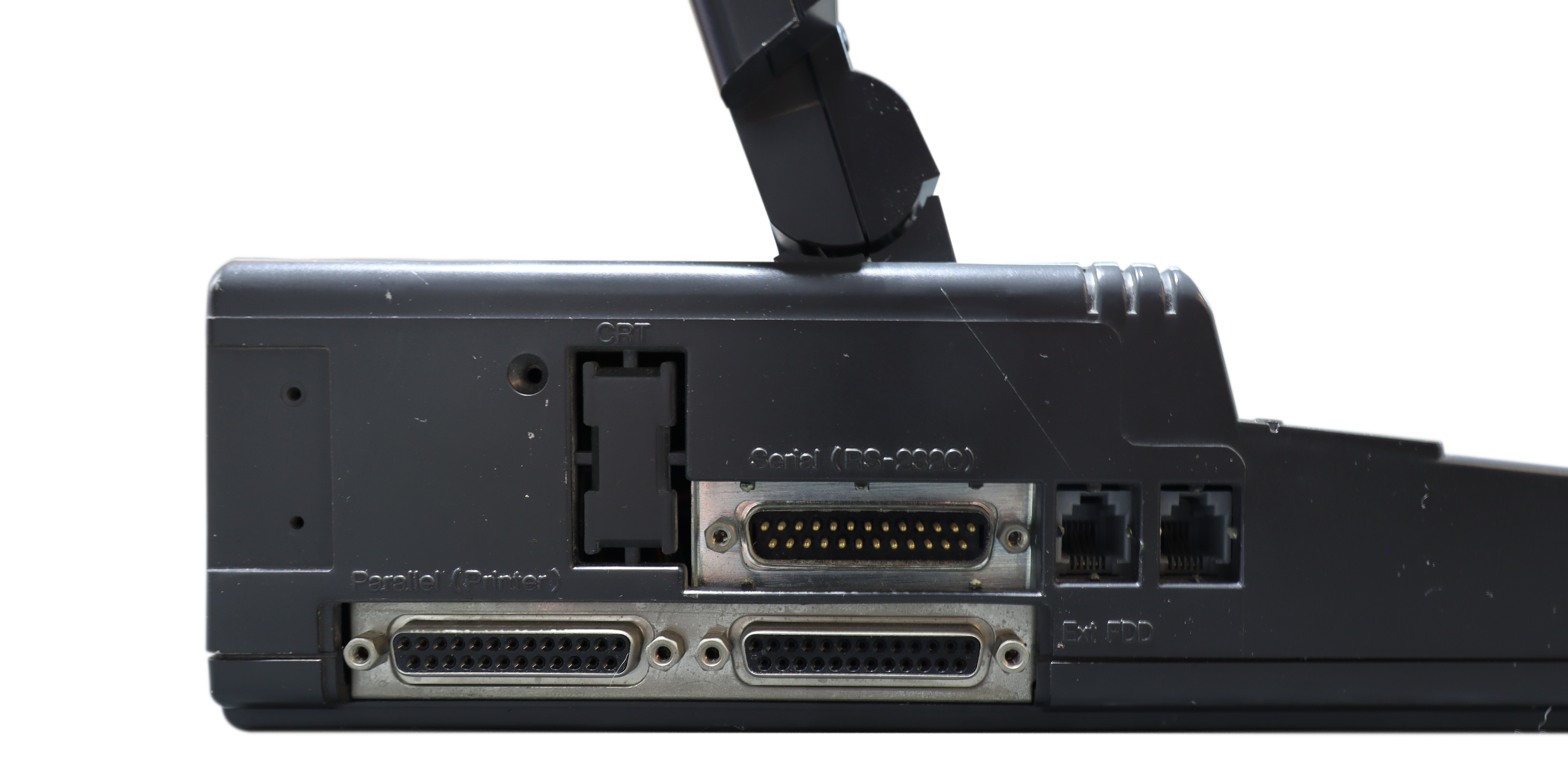
Side ports of a Sharp PC-4521; from left to right: optional CRT/RAM/EPROM port (unoccupied), serial port, and dual modem ports (top); parallel port and external floppy port (bottom).

The PC-4500 series was developed by Sharp Electronics of Japan and co-developed by Vadem Inc., an original design manufacturer and computer design consultant of San Jose, California. Vadem had previously designed Sharp's PC-7000 portable computer, which was built into a lunchbox form factor, in 1985. For the PC-4500, Vadem built the computer as a clamshell laptop. The computer features the 80188-compatible NEC V40 central processing unit with a clock speed selectable between the IBM PC standard 4.77 MHz and 7.16 MHz. The NEC V40, with its 16-bit internal data bus and 8-bit external data bus, was chosen to evade a contemporary tariff on imported laptops with pure 16-bit CPUs. Personal computers based on the 80188 processor and its derivatives were relatively uncommon.

The most inexpensive entry in the PC-4500 line, the PC-4501, features 256 KB of RAM, a non-backlit supertwisted nematic monochrome LCD with a resolution of 640 by 200 pixels—CGA compatible—a 78-key keyboard (missing a numeric keypad), and one 3.5-inch double-density floppy disk drive and came shipped with MS-DOS 2.11. The middle-of-the-line entry, the PC-4502, features 640 KB of RAM, a backlit display of the same specification, an 88-key keyboard (with numeric keypad), two 3.5-inch double-density floppy drives and came shipped with MS-DOS 3.21 and GW-BASIC 3.2. The most expensive entry, the PC-4521, trades one of the floppy drives for a 20 MB hard disk drive (HDD). All entries support 1.6 MB of RAM maximum. The display measures 9 by 4.25 inches (22.9 cm × 10.8 cm), for an aspect ratio of 2.28:1. The computers as a whole measure 12.2 by 3 by 13.7 inches (31.0 cm × 7.6 cm × 34.8 cm) and weigh approximately 12.77 pounds (5.79 kg).

All entries in the PC-4500 line come with one parallel port and one external floppy port for use with an optional external 5.25-inch floppy disk drive. Two proprietary expansion slots may hold a video card for output to external CGA monitors, a RAM card for addition memory (accordant to the Expanded Memory Specification), an EPROM card, a serial port card, and a 1,200-baud modem card. The EPROM card holds multiple EPROM chips, up to 768 KB in total, onto which software can be burned for instantaneous loading without slowdown from floppy or hard disk drive access. The memory card, the EPROM card, and the video card all occupy the same slot and cannot be used in tandem. The serial and modem cards also occupy the same slot, but the modem card comes with a serial port its own. A car charger and carrying case were respectively $30 and $75 options.

== Release and pricing ==
Sharp announced the Sharp PC-4500 line at COMDEX/Spring 1987 in June that year. Only the PC-4501 and PC-4502 were revealed at the time; shortly before COMDEX/Fall 1987 in November, Sharp announced the PC-4521. The PC-4501 and PC-4502 began shipping in October 1987, with a suggested retail price of US$1,295 and $1,695 respectively. The PC-4521 shipped in the first quarter of 1988 and had a suggested price of just under $3,000. In February 1988, Sharp dropped the price of the PC-4501 to $995, becoming one of the first manufacturers of sub-$1000 PC-compatible laptops.

== Reception and legacy ==
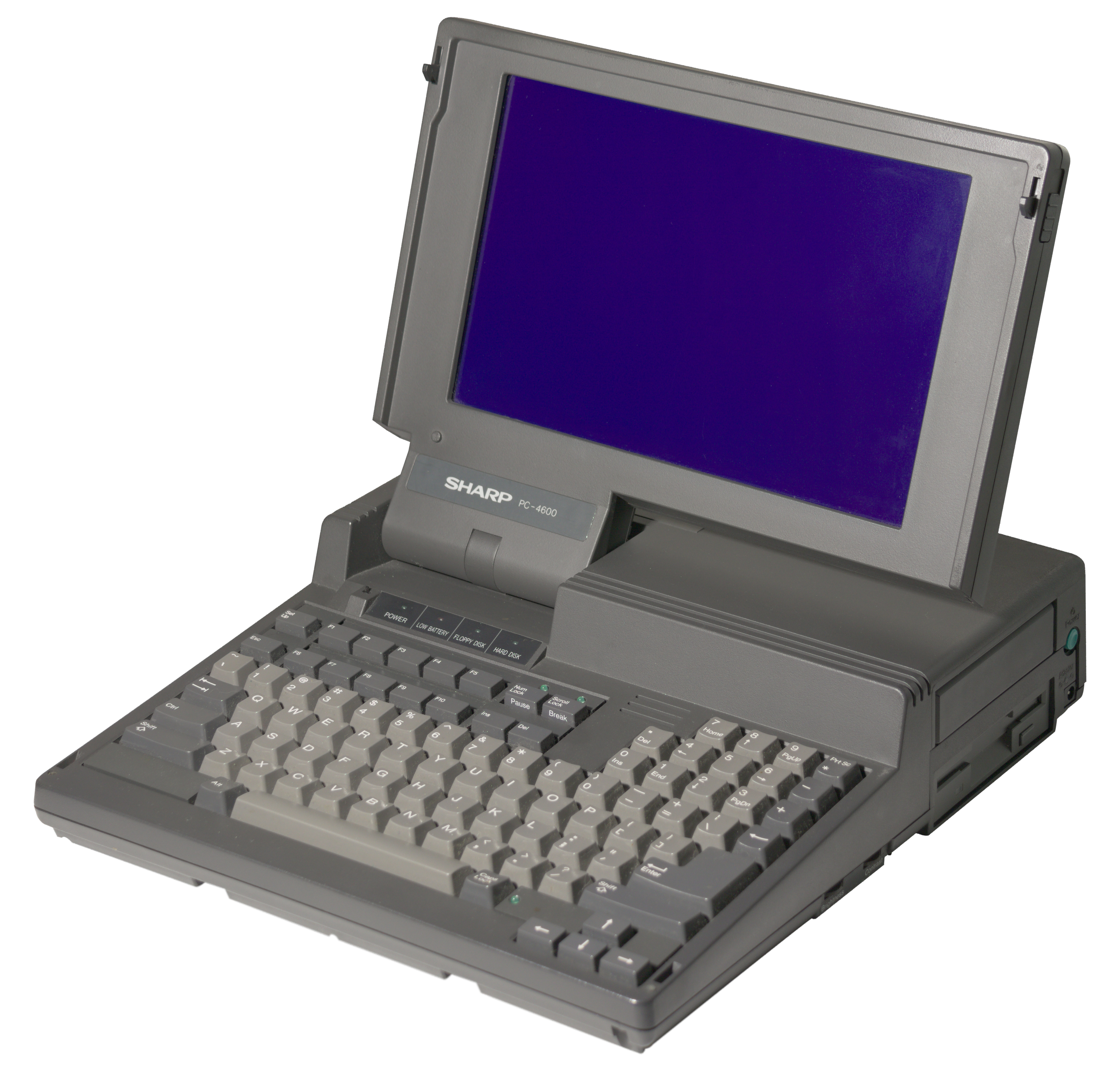
The Sharp PC-4600 series (PC-4541 model pictured) was the successor to the PC-4500 line. It features largely the same design as its predecessor while sporting a larger screen.

The PC-4500 was the seventh best-selling laptop for 1988, according to USA Today, with Sharp selling an estimated 26,000 units of PC-4500 laptops by November that year. The line was most popular among home office workers, insurance agents, salespeople, and university students.

Lamont Wood of InfoWorld rated the PC-4501 satisfactory in the categories of performance, ease-of-use, serviceability and value, and good in setting-up, but wrote that its basic features "were no longer enough in the fast-moving market of laptop computers", with the stock PC-4501 especially suffering from the lack of a built-in serial port. Wood rated its 7.16-MHz CPU only 42 percent faster than the original IBM PC's 4.77-MHz 8088, which he deemed underwhelming. Wood rated the lead-acid battery average and appreciated its invulnerability to the memory effect—a phenomenon which plagued competing laptops with nickel–cadmium batteries. He found the PC-4501's contrast ratio made for suitable reading "even in less than perfect lighting conditions" but noted that the lack of a backlight made the text-mode cursor hard to pinpoint. Wood concluded that the PC-4501's low price "just balances the lack of a backlighting option and the added cost of the serial port", rating the computer overall "a satisfactory value".

Jon Pepper of PC Week compared the PC-4501 to Toshiba's T1100 Plus in aesthetic and form factor and praised the layout of its keyboard while noting that its key switches provided too much resistance. Pepper called the BIOS setup utility a "plus" and called the computer's battery long-lasting but disliked the display and its lack of backlighting, which, while adding to "the longevity of the battery and display ... also requires optimum lighting conditions for legibility—something that can't be counted on in on-the-go situations". Howard Blumenthal of the Chicago Sun-Times meanwhile called its display "better than those on other laptops" and wrote that the features it lacked compared to other offerings at the time were not necessary for most road warriors and that its low cost made up for the lack of those features. Gus Venditto of PC Magazine wrote that the PC-4501's keyboard was "up there with the best of them", with its key feel "springier" than and layout superior to that of IBM's PC Convertible. Venditto disliked the power button's lack of tactile feedback and wrote that the display's contrast knob was hard to find, "unobtrusive to the point of becoming lost".

PC Magazine's Luisa Simone wrote that the PC-4521 bore an "odd mix of high-performance features and uncomfortable design", as if "the engineers looked at the computer blueprints but never used the computer". She called the V20 CPU "more than fast enough for standard applications" after testing it against XyWrite and Lotus 1-2-3 and praised the versatility of the BIOS setup utility. Simone wrote that the PC-4521's LCD had a subpar contrast ratio and that the peak brightness of the backlight failed to prevent the display from becoming washed out in direct sunlight. She called the laptop's dimensional depth perhaps "a little to deep for an airline tray" but found it and the lower-cost PC-4501 and PC-4502 exceptionally lightweight. Simone appreciated the keyboard's full-size layout—barring the split function key rows—but deemed the weight of the keyboard's switches stiff: "after 30 minutes of typing, my pinkies protested and went on strike". Simone found the laptop overall very price competitive but with compromises to comfort.

InfoWorld rated the PC-4521 a good value, with Sherwin Levinson writing that the laptop had the slowest CPU of nine laptops tested but featured the best keyboard of those nine. In particular, the keyboard scored high points for its completeness; however, like Simone he criticized the splitting of the function keys into rows and defined the key switch feel as "spongy". Levinson called the display washed-out but legible and the battery life satisfactory. He concluded that the computer in its stock configuration, without the optional serial port and monitor output, were the main tradeoffs to its low cost.

John Diebold of PC World wrote that the PC-4521 had the "dubious distinction of being the slowest laptop" in their benchmark of seven laptops contemporary to it but that also it was "the cheapest, and at just under 15 pounds ... the second lightest". He called it a "bad choice" for most business users and a good choice for budget-conscious users. Diebold called the display "small but readable" and appreciated the computer's wake-on-ring feature of its modem firmware but found the PC-4521's power-savings abilities among the worst of the magazine's roundup. Rich Malloy of Byte found the PC-4521 sturdy and performant but recommended that users needing a more versatile computer look elsewhere. He wrote that the LCD suffered from a slow refresh rate but found its dark-blue-on-light-blue color scheme "easy on the eyes".

Sharp succeeded the PC-4500 with the PC-4600 series, introduced at COMDEX/Fall 1988 in November that year and released in early 1989. It featured largely the same design as the PC-4500, including the same NEC V40 processor as the PC-4500, however with the clock speed increased to 10 MHz, and with support for the same EPROM card as the PC-4500 series. It increased the screen resolution to 640 by 400 pixels, twice the amount of vertical lines as the PC-4500 series, allowing it to support the high-resolution CGA modes. The displays on the PC-4600 series are also capable of displaying 16 shades of gray, unlike the PC-4500, which is limited to 1-bit monochrome (black or white). The PC-4600 series consists of the PC-4602, featuring two 3.5-inch double-density floppy drives, and the PC-4641, featuring one 3.5-inch double-density floppy drive and a 40 MB HDD.
