= DOS Shell =

File manager

- Developer: Microsoft
- Release: June 1988; 38 years ago
- Operating system: MS-DOS and PC DOS
- Platform: x86
- Successor: File Manager, Windows Explorer
- Type: File manager
- License: Commercial software

DOS Shell is a file manager that debuted in MS-DOS and PC DOS version 4.0, released in June 1988. It was no longer included in MS-DOS version 6, but remained part of the Supplemental Disk. The Supplemental Disk could be ordered or could be downloaded through Microsoft's FTP server. DOS Shell was retained in PC DOS until PC DOS 2000.

== Overview ==
DOS Shell was one of the first successful attempts to create a basic graphical user interface (GUI) type file manager in DOS, although it is properly referred to as a text user interface (TUI) or Character-Oriented Windows (COW) even though graphical modes were available on supported hardware (VGA-equipped PCs). The shell is very much like a DOS version of File Manager found in Windows up to versions 3.11 and NT 3.51, and File Explorer on later versions.

An early incarnation of DOS Shell, titled MS-DOS Manager, was bundled exclusively with the Eazy PC, an IBM PC clone manufactured by Zenith Data Systems in 1987.

In MS-DOS 4.x and 5.x, the program was implemented as COM file (DOSSHELL.COM). In MS-DOS 6 the executable had an .EXE filename extension (DOSSHELL.EXE).

== Features ==
The shell includes common features seen in other file managers such as copying, moving and renaming files as well as the ability to launch applications with a double-click. The shell could be run by the command "DOSSHELL". It had the ability to set simple colours and styles.

The shell also has a help system, a program list, and a task swapper. Like many modern file managers, it had the ability to display dual hierarchy directory and file lists, i.e. left and right panes, displaying both a list of directory contents and the hierarchical file path to the current working directory. A mouse was supported, however, like any other DOS application, it required an appropriate device driver.

One feature was the ability to list all files on a hard drive in a single alphabetized list along with the path and other attributes. This permitted the user to compare versions of a file in different directories by their attributes and easily spot duplicates.

== Shortcomings ==
DOS Shell was incapable of full multitasking. It supported rudimentary task switching, where only one foreground program would execute, while those in the background would be suspended, with their conventional memory state saved to a temporary swap file on the disk. The user could switch between programs using the interrupt key combination Ctrl+Esc. This process was managed by a helper executable, DOSSWAP.EXE.

In time, Windows 3.1x, with its own graphical user interface, became much more popular among computer users. Windows was capable of multitasking. System performance was much higher, with complete access to extended memory.

== See also ==
- ViewMAX – the equivalent component in DR DOS
- XTree
- Comparison of file managers
- COMMAND.COM
