= Windows File Manager =

File manager bundled with Microsoft Windows in the 1990s

File Manager
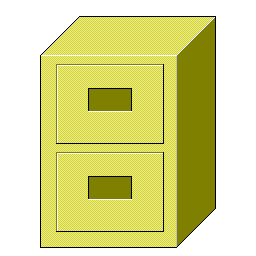

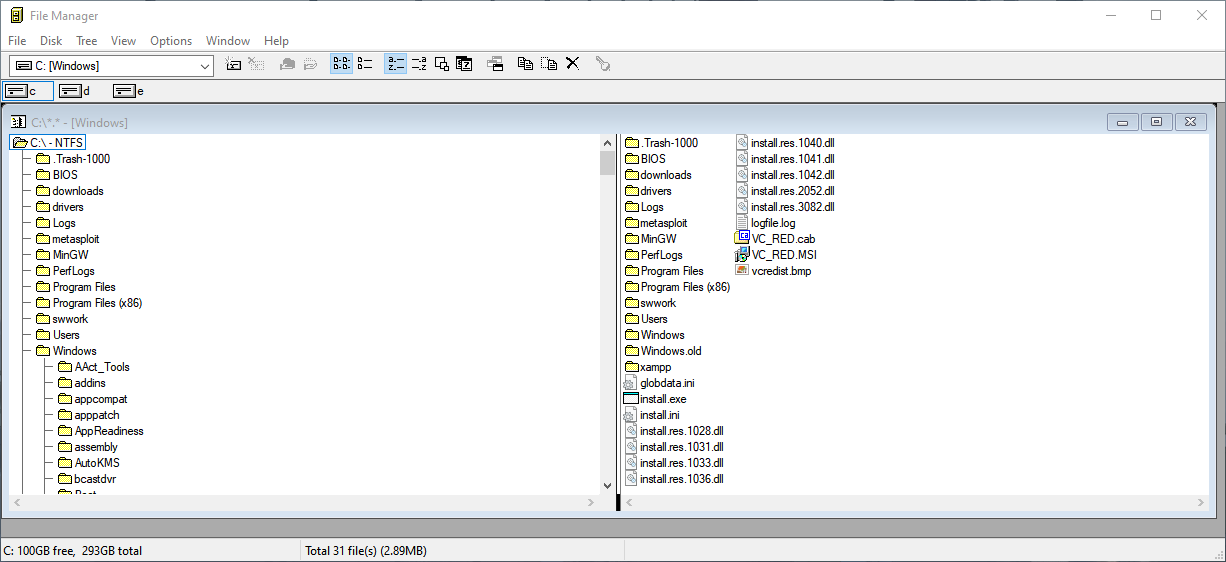
- File Manager in Windows 10
- Original author: Chris Guzak
- Developer: Microsoft
- Initial release: November 1988; 37 years ago (OS/2; as File System); May 22, 1990; 36 years ago (Windows)
- Stable release: 10.4.0.0 / February 21, 2025; 15 months ago
- Written in: C, C++
- Operating system: OS/2, Microsoft Windows
- Platform: IA-32, x86-64, and ARM64
- Predecessor: MS-DOS Executive
- Successor: Windows Explorer
- Type: File manager
- License: MIT License
- Repository: github.com/Microsoft/winfile

File Manager is a file manager program originally bundled with releases of OS/2 and Microsoft Windows between 1988 and 2000. It is a single-instance graphical interface, replacing the command-line interface of MS-DOS to manage files (copy, move, open, delete, search, etc.) and MS-DOS Executive file manager from previous Windows versions.

Although File Manager was included in Windows 95 and Windows NT 4.0 and some later versions, Windows Explorer was introduced and used as the primary file manager, with file management via a two-pane view different from that of File Manager, and a single-pane view obtained by clicking a "My Computer" icon.

File Manager was reintroduced on 6 April 2018 as an open-source project which improves some aspects of the program, including being offered as a native 64-bit application. It has been made as an optional download for all modern releases of Windows (including Windows 10 and later) via the Microsoft Store.

== Overview ==
The program's interface showed a list of directories on the left hand panel, and a list of the current directory's contents on the right hand panel. File Manager allowed a user to create, rename, move, print, copy, search for, and delete files and directories, as well as to set permissions (attributes) such as archive, read-only, hidden or system, and to associate file types with programs. Also available were tools to label and format disks, manage folders for file sharing and to connect and disconnect from a network drive. On Windows NT systems it was also possible to set ACLs on files and folders on NTFS partitions through the shell32 security configuration dialog (also used by Explorer and other Windows file managers). On NTFS drives, individual files or entire folders could be compressed or expanded. The Windows NT version of File Manager also allows users to change directory, file, local, network and user permissions.

From Windows 95 and Windows NT 4.0 onward, File Manager was superseded by Windows Explorer. However, the WINFILE.EXE program file was still included with Windows 95, 98 and Windows Me (16-bit executable), as well as Windows NT 4.0 (32-bit executable). The last 32-bit WINFILE.EXE build (4.0.1381.318) was distributed as part of Windows NT 4.0 Service Pack 6a (SP6a) in 1999, while the last 16-bit WINFILE.EXE build (4.90.3000) was distributed as part of Windows Me in 2000.

== Versions ==
=== 16-bit OS/2 and Windows 3.x ===
File Manager was first introduced in OS/2 versions 1.1, 1.2 and 1.3. The initial version was released in 1988 as part of OS/2 1.1, initially under the name "File System" with an executable name of PMFILE.EXE (the "PM" stood for Presentation Manager, which was the GUI of OS/2 first introduced with version 1.1).

The original version of File Manager was a 16-bit program that supported the 8.3 file names that were in use at the time; it did not support the extended file names that became available in Windows 95 – including long file names and file names containing spaces. Instead, it would display only the first six characters followed by a tilde character ("~") and a number, usually 1. More numbers (2, 3, and so on) were added after the tilde if more than one file name with the same initial characters existed in the same directory.

Original Windows File Manager icon

The first version of File Manager for Microsoft Windows was introduced as a 16-bit application starting with Windows 3.0 in 1990 with the executable name WINFILE.EXE (short for "Windows File Manager"). The 16-bit version distributed with Windows 3.1 and Windows for Workgroups 3.1 installations had a Y2K issue due to lexicographic correlation between date representation and the ASCII character set; colons and semicolons replaced what should have been '2000'. Microsoft issued corrected binaries for all Windows 3.1 environments in 1997.

Chris Guzak was the shell developer on the Windows 3.1 team responsible for the Windows version of File Manager.

=== Windows 9x ===
File Manager was superseded by Windows Explorer in all versions of Windows 9x starting with Windows 95, however File Manager itself continued to be included in Windows 9x releases such as Windows 95, 98, and Me. The program across all Windows 9x releases remained as a 16-bit program and was relatively unchanged from Windows 3.1.

=== Windows NT ===
File Manager was rewritten as a 32-bit program for Windows NT. This new version correctly handled long file names (and file names containing spaces) in addition to adding support for NTFS file systems. It was included with Windows NT 3.1, 3.5, 3.51, and 4.0.

=== Windows 10 and later ===
On 6 April 2018, Microsoft released binaries and the source code, licensed under the MIT License, for an improved version of File Manager running on Windows 10. Based on the latest 32-bit version of File Manager that was originally included with Windows NT 4.0, this version included changes such as the ability to compile in modern versions of Visual Studio, the ability to compile as a 64-bit application, and numerous usability improvements. The source code was released with an MIT license on GitHub by Microsoft. Microsoft also released this version of File Manager on the Microsoft Store for free in late January 2019, which is compatible with all modern releases of Windows including Windows 10 and later.

As of 4 March 2025, Microsoft has archived the repository for File Manager on GitHub and will no longer maintain the source code of the application due to the historical nature of the software. Users are allowed to fork the repository containing the File Manager source code and make their own modifications and do whatever they like with it, but with a warning about the risks associated with creating forks of archived repositories, including File Manager.

== See also ==
- DOS Shell
- List of formerly proprietary software
