= IBM PCradio =

Notebook computer released in 1991

- PCradio running its bespoke task management software; its thermal printer sits above the keyboard.
- Manufacturer: International Business Machines
- Type: Notebook
- Released: August 13, 1991; 35 years ago
- Availability: December 1991
- Lifespan: 1991–1993
- Introductory price: Starting at $5,500
- Discontinued: August 13, 1993; 33 years ago
- Units sold: Fewer than 10,000
- Operating system: PC DOS
- CPU: Intel 80C186 at 5–10 MHz
- Memory: 640 KB
- Storage: SRAM modules (up to 2 MB)
- Display: Monochrome LCD
- Graphics: CGA
- Dimensions: 10.5 in × 8.4 in × 2.5 in (26.7 cm × 21.3 cm × 6.4 cm)
- Weight: 6.4 pounds (2.9 kg)

The PCradio is a discontinued notebook computer released by International Business Machines (IBM) in 1991. Designed primarily for mobile workers such as service technicians, salespersons and public safety workers, the PCradio features a ruggedized build with no internal hard disk drive and was optioned with either a cellular or ARDIS RF modem, in addition to a standard landline modem.

== Components ==
The internals of the PCradio were encased in a slate-gray, hardened plastic case, which IBM said was resistant to heat, moisture, impact and certain chemicals. Its port doors, connectors, and keyboard were designed to be water-resistant through the use of gaskets, seals, and O-rings. It featured a monochrome LCD capable of rendering graphics in CGA mode and text at 80 columns by 25 lines. The laptop was powered by either a nickel–cadmium battery or a wall or car power adapter.

To keep the PCradio ruggedized, IBM offered SRAM modules of various capacities up to 2 MB for file storage, in lieu of a mechanical hard disk drive. Special versions of Siega System's One-Button Mail, an e-mail client, Traveling Software's Battery Watch, a battery management application, and LapLink, a file transfer program, were developed with drivers to support the PCradio's special hardware. The latter, renamed to Notebook Manager, came bundled with the PCradio as a ROM module. Owing to its ruggedized nature, the PCradio could operate between 32 degrees and 132 degrees Fahrenheit. A thermal printer which accepted paper 3-1/8 inches in diameter was optional.

The cellular model was capable of sending and receiving faxes, at a rate of 9.6 KB per second—twice that of its cellular data speed of 4.8 KB per second. Meanwhile the landline model was capable of sending but not receiving faxes, and the ARDIS model could not receive faxes whatsoever. The cellular model could also be used for voice communications with the optional handset.

== Development ==
The PCradio project was helmed by Robert A. Lundy, a director and general manager in charge of the wireless business unit of IBM's Industry Products Group facility Boca Raton, Florida. The project commenced in 1989 and comprised a team of 25 people in Boca Raton, including Lundy. They hired Vadem, an original design manufacturer from San Jose, California, as a consultant on the project. IBM reportedly spent $50 million in development costs. The PCradio was ultimately manufactured at IBM's North Carolina and Scotland facilities, with the cellular modem made by Novatel Communications at their Lethbridge, Alberta, factory and IBM's Don Mills, Toronto, facility. The ARDIS modem, meanwhile, was manufactured by Motorola and designed at their Richmond, British Columbia, facility. This ARDIS modem was designed to consume less power than conventional data radios, enabling the PCradio's battery to last longer on a charge.

IBM unveiled the PCradio on August 13, 1991, and began shipping it to the general public in the third week of December 1991, following approval by the FCC earlier in the month. Prior to this approval, McCaw Cellular forged a relationship with IBM to become the first carrier of the cellular model of PCradio. Coverage eventually expanded to other carriers operated by the Regional Bell Operating Companies, including BellSouth.

== Reception ==
One analyst saw a large market for the PCradio and other digital wireless devices, which IBM hoped to dominate similar to how they captured the personal computer market with the IBM PC in the early 1980s. According to Robert R. Daly, a product manager of the Boca Raton facility, the company expected to sell up to 100,000 units in two years. However, only slightly fewer than 10,000 units of the PCradio were sold by August 1994. Among the few and first to use it was Sears, whose service technicians in California used the PCradio to receive timely updates to parts availability and prices from 1992 until 1994, when they replaced it with a more powerful unit produced by Itronix. Several police departments and emergency services in the United States also used the PCradio, including the Baltimore Police Department, who purchased a fleet of PCradios for their officers and dispatchers, where it was used to call up vehicle information and map directions and send and receive incident reports. The department also used it for making discreet reports of drug dealings, instead of having to use the vocal police radio channels to which dealers often had scanners tuned—fleeing the scene if an officer made a description of their likeness.

IBM discontinued the PCradio on August 13, 1993. In August 1994, they sold their remaining stock, parts and tooling to Aspen Marine Group of West Palm Beach, Florida, where they rebadged the unsold PCradios under their Aptek sub-brand and sold an equivalent model targeting the same market. The same month, IBM released the Simon, a BellSouth-powered cellular PDA that could place phone calls and access the Internet.

== Models ==
PCradio
IBM P/N	Processor	Clock speed	RAM	Communications method	Communications speed	Fax capability and speed
9075-001	Intel 80C186	5–10 MHz	640 KB	Landline	2.4 KB/sec	Yes (sending only), 2.4 KB/sec
9075-002	Intel 80C186	5–10 MHz	640 KB	ARDIS	4.8 KB/sec	No
9075-003	Intel 80C186	5–10 MHz	640 KB	Cellular	4.8 KB/sec	Yes (sending and receiving), 9.6 KB/sec

Features and accessories
Feature	IBM P/N
0.5 MB SRAM storage	04G1470
0.5 MB ROM	04G1472
2.0 MB ROM	04G1473
Combination 0.5 MB SRAM storage/0.5 MB ROM	04G1474
Combination 1.0MB SRAM storage/0.5 MB ROM	04G1475
40-column thermal printer	92F1132
Breakout box	92F1131
Model 001 to 002 conversion kit	92F1148
Model 001 to 003 conversion kit	92F1149
Ni-Cd battery pack	92F1135
AC adapter	92F1145
Telephone cable, 6-ft	92F1138
DC car charger	92F1146
Carrying case	92F1140
Cellular telephone handset	92F1134
Carrying strap	92F1142

== Timeline ==
Timeline of the IBM Personal Computer

Asterisk (*) denotes a model released in Japan only
