= NEC V20 =

16-bit microprocessor introduced by NEC

NEC V20 (μPD70108)
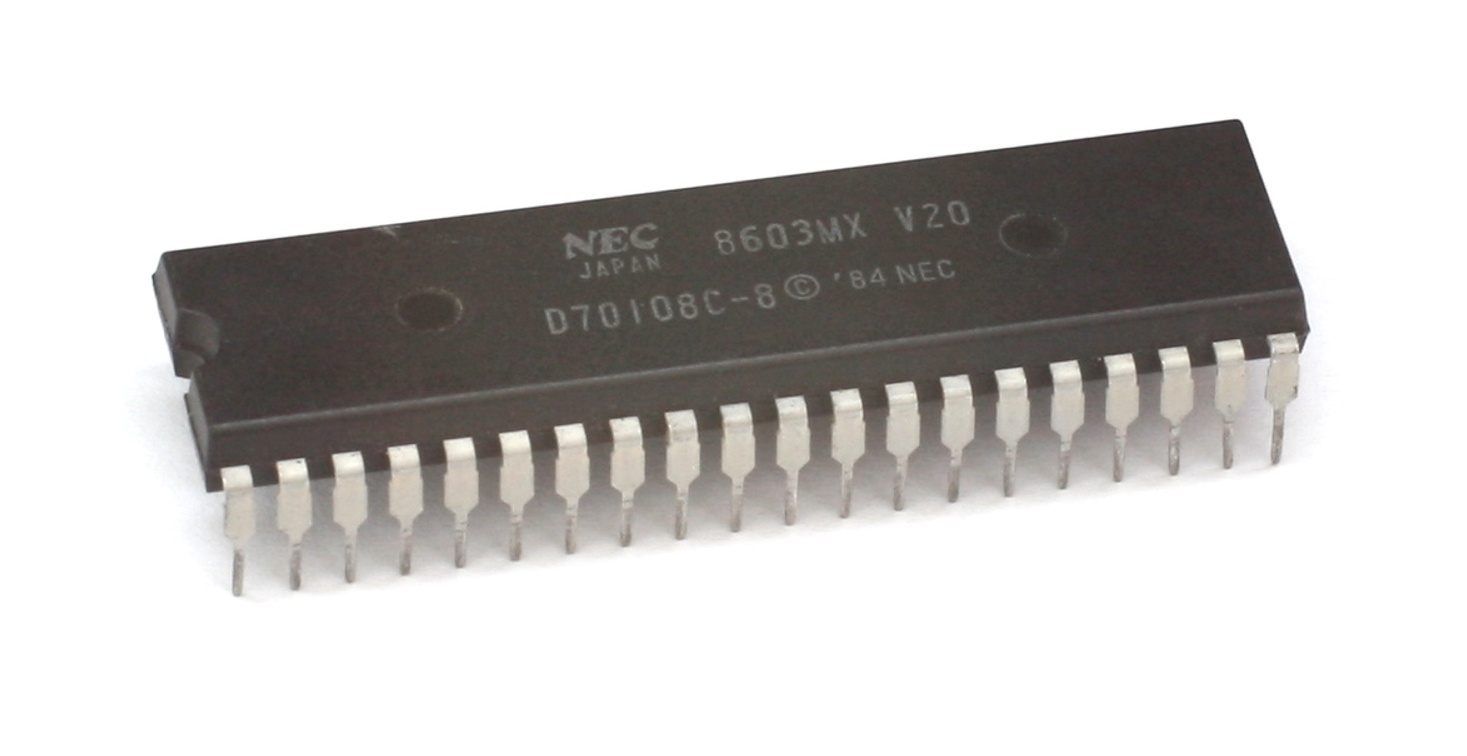
- 8 MHz V20 in plastic DIP package

General information
- Launched: November 1982; 43 years ago
- Common manufacturers: NEC (μPD70108); Sharp (LH70108); Sony (CXQ70108); Zilog (Z70108)

Performance
- Data width: 16 bits

Physical specifications
- Transistors: 63000
- Cores: 1
- Co-processor: Intel 8087; NEC μPD72091

History
- Successor: NEC V60

The NEC V20 is a microprocessor that was designed and produced by NEC. It is both pin compatible and object-code compatible with the Intel 8088, with an instruction set architecture (ISA) similar to that of the Intel 80188 with some extensions. The V20 was introduced in November 1982.

== Features ==
The V20's die comprised 63,000 transistors; more than double the 29,000 of the 8088 CPU. The chip was designed for a clock duty cycle of 50%, compared to the 33% duty cycle used by the 8088. The V20 has two 16-bit wide internal databuses, allowing two data transfers to occur concurrently. Differences like that meant that a V20 could typically complete more instructions in a given time than an Intel 8088 running at the same frequency.

The V20 was fabricated in 2-micron CMOS technology. Early versions ran at speeds of 5, 8, and 10 MHz. In 1990, an upgrade to the fabrication process technology resulted in the V20H and V20HL, with improved performance and reduced power consumption. Later versions added speeds of 12 and 16 MHz. The V20HLs were also completely static, allowing their clock to be stopped.

The V20 was described as 16-bits wide internally. It used an 8-bit external data bus that was multiplexed onto the same pins as the low byte of the address bus. Its 20-bit wide address bus was able to address 1 MB of memory.

The V20 was reported to have been compatible with the Intel 8087 floating-point unit (FPU) coprocessor. NEC also designed their own FPU, the μPD72091, which was cancelled before reaching production. They followed this with a revised design, the μPD72191, but it is unclear how many, if any, of this second part were produced.

The V30, a nearly identical CPU with a 16-bit wide external data bus, debuted on September 1, 1983. It was pin and object-code compatible with the Intel 8086.

== ISA extensions ==
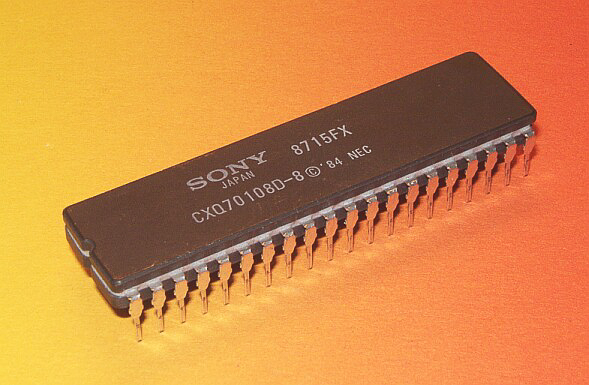
Sony CXQ70108D 8 MHz

The V20's ISA includes several instructions not executed by the 8088, with instructions for bit manipulation, packed BCD operations, multiplication, and division. They also include new real-mode instructions from the Intel 80286.

The ADD4S, SUB4S, and CMP4S instructions were able to add, subtract, and compare huge packed binary-coded decimal numbers stored in memory. Instructions ROL4 and ROR4 rotate four-bit nibbles. Another family consisted of the TEST1, SET1, CLR1, and NOT1 instructions, which test, set, clear, and invert single bits of their operands, but are far less efficient than the later i80386 equivalents BT, BTS, BTR, and BTC; neither are their encodings compatible. There were two instructions to extract and insert bit fields of arbitrary lengths (EXT, INS). And finally, there were two additional repeat prefixes, REPC and REPNC, which amended the original REPE and REPNE instructions for scanning a string of bytes or words (with instructions SCAS and CMPS) while a less or not less condition remained true.

The V20 offered a mode that emulated an Intel 8080 CPU. A BRKEM instruction is issued to start 8080 emulation. The operand of the instruction specifies an interrupt number whose vector contains the segment:offset where emulation is to begin. To end, a RETEM instruction is issued in 8080 code. One feature not often employed is the CALLN (call native) which issues an 8086-type interrupt call that enables x86 code (which returns using an IRET) to be mixed in with 8080 code.

Another mode put the processor into a power-saving state via a HALT instruction.

== Lawsuits ==
In 1982, Intel sued NEC over the latter's μPD8086 and μPD8088. This suit was settled out of court, with NEC agreeing to license the designs from Intel.

In late 1984, Intel again filed suit against NEC, claiming that the microcode in the V20 and V30 infringed its patents for the 8088 and 8086 processors. NEC software engineer Hiroaki Kaneko had studied both the hardware design of the Intel CPUs and the original Intel microcode.

In its ruling, on September 22, 1986, the court determined that the microcode in the control store constitutes a computer program, and so is protected by copyright. They further found Intel to have forfeited their copyright by neglecting to ensure that all second-source chips were suitably marked. The court also determined that NEC did not simply copy Intel's microcode, and that the microcode in the V20 and V30 was sufficiently different from Intel's to not infringe Intel's copyright.

The judge in the case accepted NEC's cleanroom evidence. He also approved of NEC's use of reverse engineering with respect to the creation of NEC's Rev.2 microcode, without commenting on it with respect to the Rev.0 code.

== Variants and successors ==
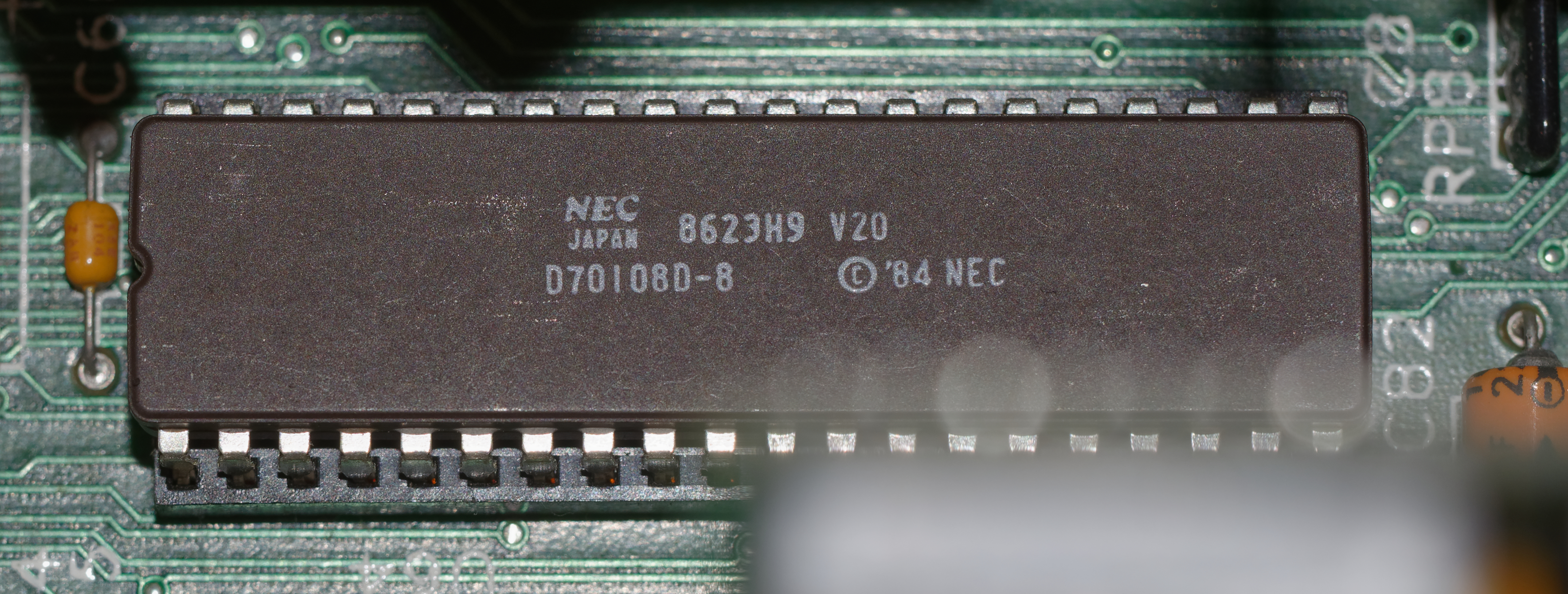
V20 on a motherboard

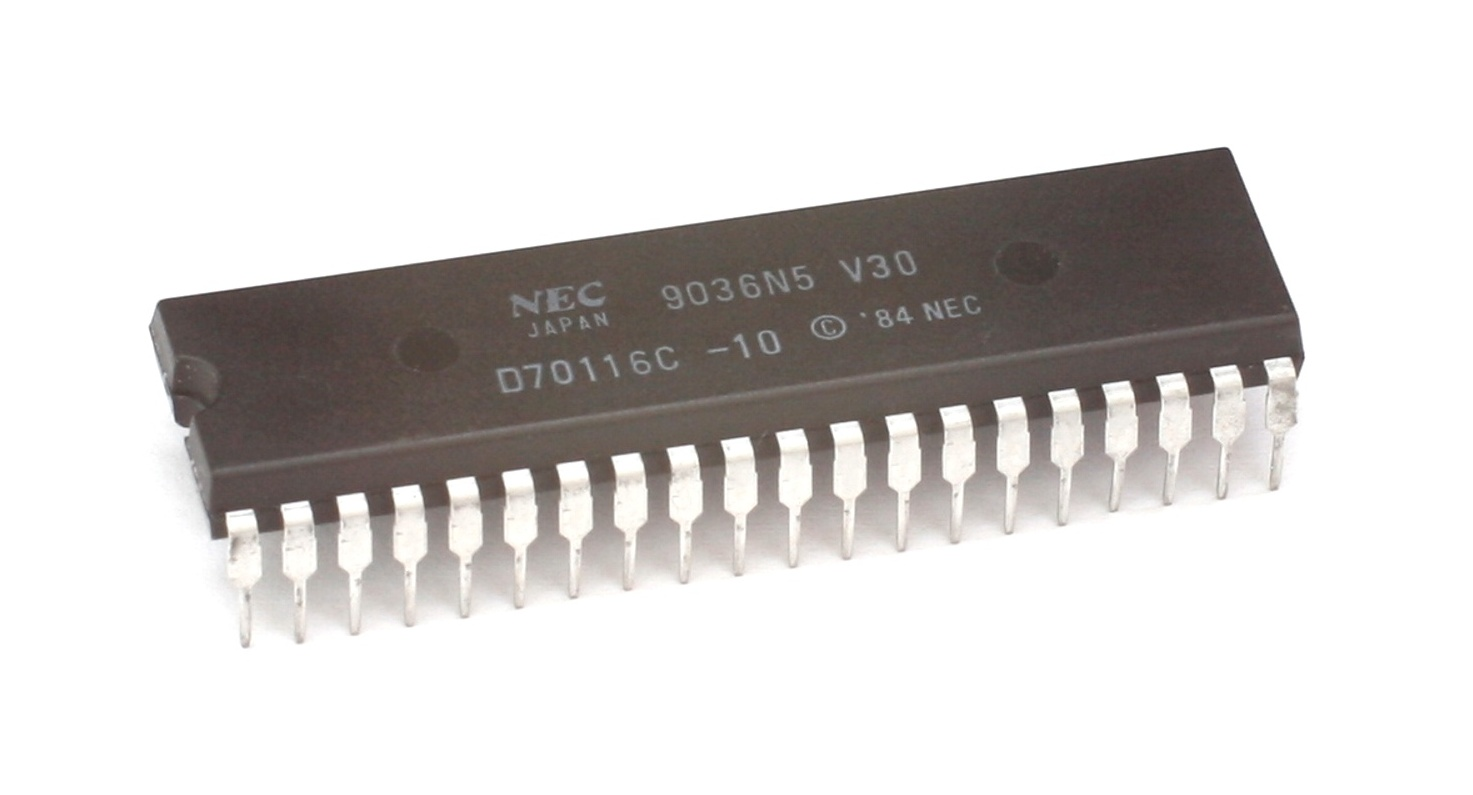
NEC V30 (μPD70116), 10 MHz

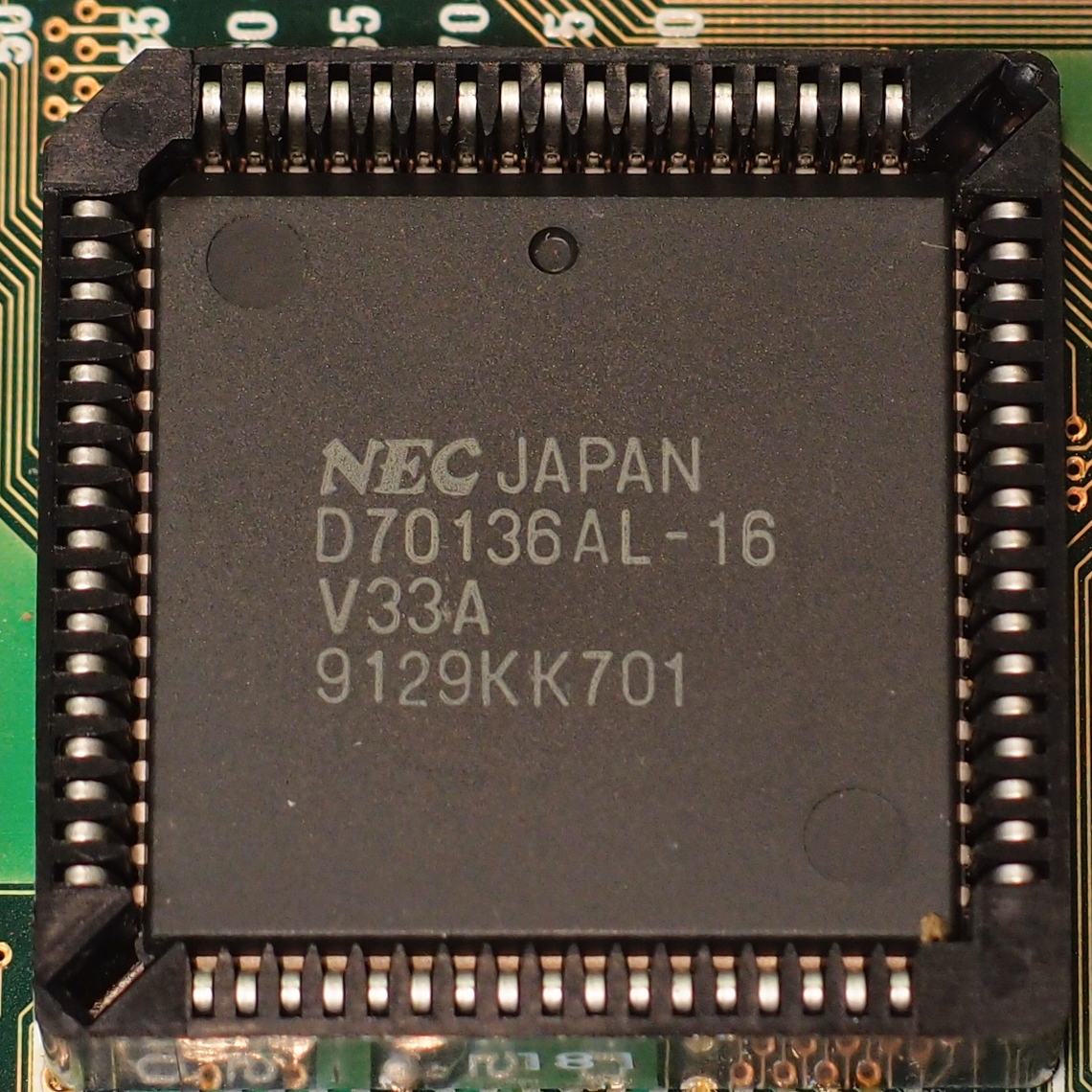
NEC V33A (μPD70136AL)

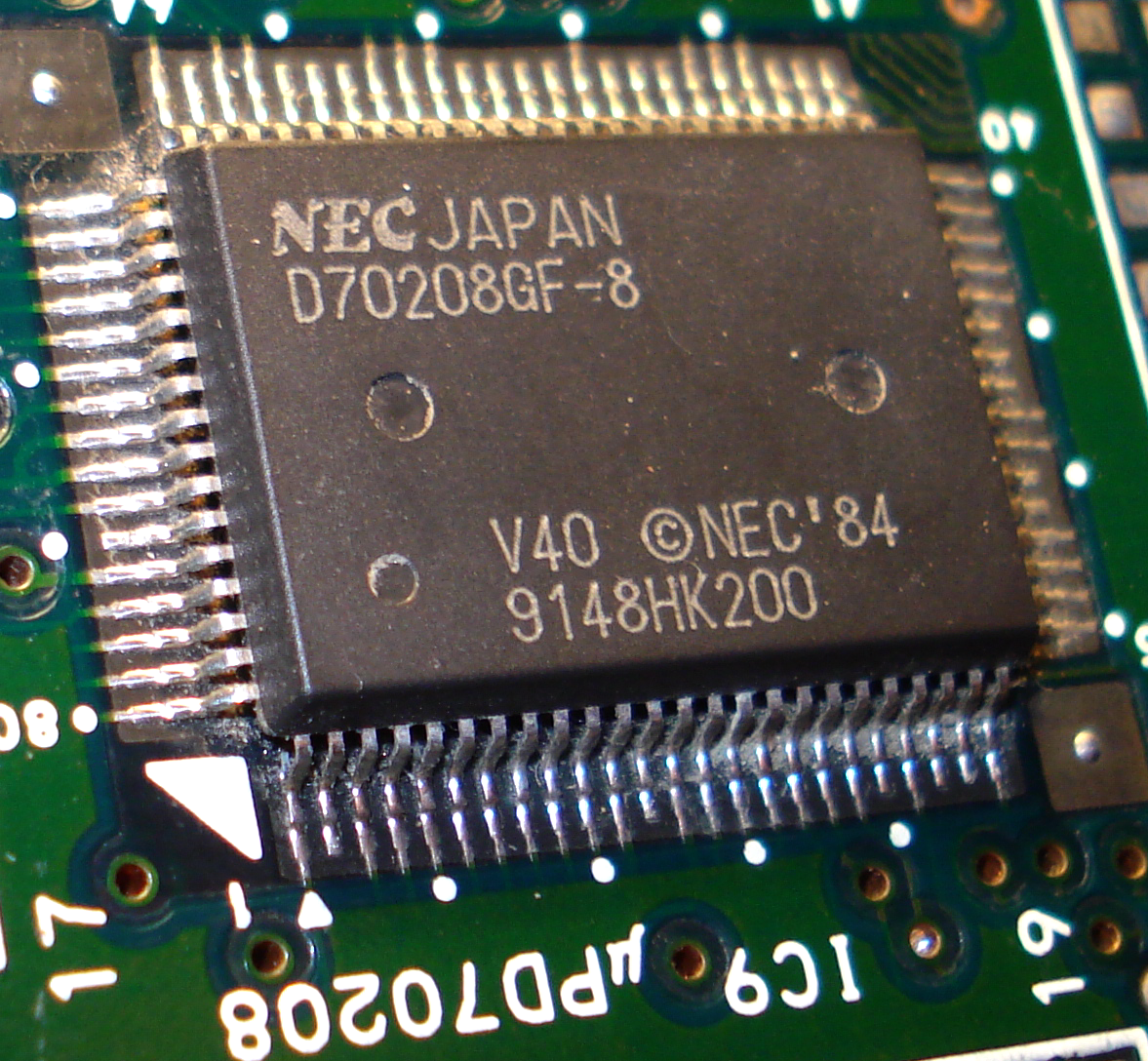
NEC V40 (μPD70208)

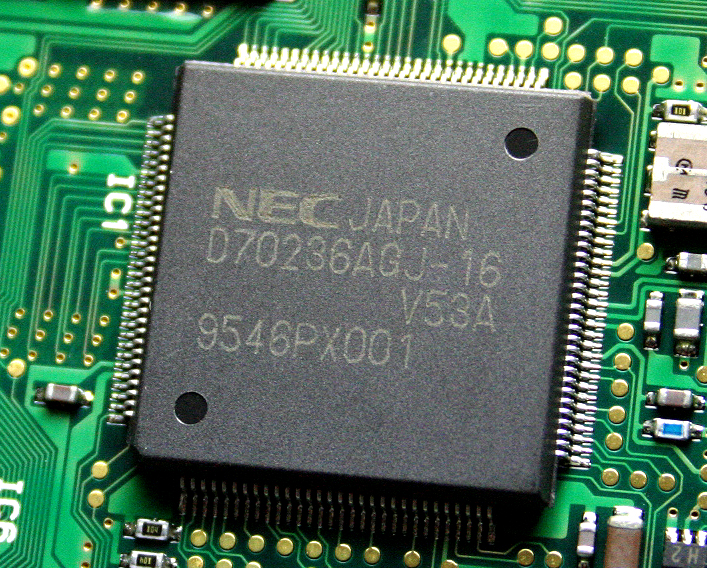
NEC V53A (μPD70236A)

Product	Part no.	Details
Microprocessors
NEC V30	μPD70116	Essentially an NEC V20 with a 16-bit external data bus, the V30 was pin compatible with the Intel 8086. The V30 was a factory upgrade from the 8086 used in the GTD-5 EAX Class 5 central office switch. It was also used in the Psion Series 3, the NEC PC-9801VM, the Olivetti PCS86, the Applied Engineering "PC Transporter" card for the Apple II series of computers, and in various arcade machines (particularly ones made by Irem) in the late 1980s.
NEC V20HL	μPD70108H	High-speed (up to 16 MHz), low-power version of the V20.
NEC V30HL	μPD70116H	High-speed (up to 16 MHz), low-power version of the V30.
NEC V33	μPD70136	A version of the V30 with separate address and data buses and with instruction decode done by hardwired logic rather than a microprogrammed control store. Throughput is twice as high as a V30 for the same clock frequency. The V33 has performance equivalent to Intel 80286. Memory address space is increased to 16M bytes. Two additional instructions, BRKXA and RETXA, support the extended addressing mode. 8080 emulation is not supported.
NEC V33A	μPD70136A	Differs from the V33 in that it has interrupt vector numbers compatible with Intel's 80X86 processors. (The "undefined instruction trap" was moved from vector 122 to vector 6, and "coprocessor not present" was moved from vector 130 to vector 7.)
Microprocessors with integrated PC-compatible peripherals
NEC V40	μPD70208	An embedded version of the V20, integrated Intel-compatible 8251 USART, 8253 programmable interval timer, 8259 interrupt controller, and 8237 DMA controller. Used in the Olivetti Prodest PC1, Olivetti M200, Olivetti ETV 2700, Olivetti ETV 2900, Olivetti VM 2000, Digisystems Jetta XD, the Sharp PC-4500 and the Zenith Eazy PC.
NEC V40HL	μPD70208H	A high-speed, low-voltage version of the V40.
NEC V50	μPD70216	An embedded version of the V30, with a 16-bit bus and the same set of embedded peripherals as the V40. It is the main CPU in the Akai S1000 and S1100, and the Korg M1.
NEC V50HL	μPD70216H	A high-speed, low-voltage version of the V50.
—N/a	μPD9002	A custom-designed processor the for NEC PC-88VA series of home computers. Based on NEC V50, with the Intel 8080 emulation mode of the V50 modified to support the Zilog Z80 instruction set.
NEC V41	μPD70270	Integrates a V30HL core and PC-XT peripherals: 8255 parallel port interface, 8254 programmable interval timer, 8259 PIC, 8237 DMA controller and 8042 keyboard controller. Also integrates full DRAM controller.
NEC V51	μPD70280	Integrates a V30HL core and PC-XT peripherals: 8255 parallel port interface, 8254 programmable interval timer, 8259 PIC, 8237 DMA controller and 8042 keyboard controller. Also integrates full DRAM controller. Was used in the Olivetti Quaderno PT-XT-20.
NEC V53	μPD70236	Integrates a V33 core with 4-channel DMA (μPD71071/i8237), UART (μPD71051/i8251), three timer/counters (μPD71054/i8254) and interrupt controller (μPD71059/i8259). It was used in the Akai MPC3000 and Akai SG01v.
NEC V53A	μPD70236A	Integrates some peripherals with a V33A core. Used in Sharp Zaurus PI-B304/B308
Microcontrollers with embedded 78000-series peripherals
NEC V25	μPD70320	A microcontroller version of the NEC V20. Combines the instruction set of the V20 with many of the on-chip peripherals in NEC's 78000 series, such as an interrupt controller, a DMA engine, two timers, two UARTs, analog comparators, and general-purpose I/O pins. The μPD70322 variant includes a 16 KByte on-chip mask ROM that is not present in the μPD70320.
NEC V25	μPD70322	A microcontroller version of the NEC V20. Combines the instruction set of the V20 with many of the on-chip peripherals in NEC's 78000 series, such as an interrupt controller, a DMA engine, two timers, two UARTs, analog comparators, and general-purpose I/O pins. The μPD70322 variant includes a 16 KByte on-chip mask ROM that is not present in the μPD70320.
NEC V25HS	μPD79011	A version of the V25 with the RX116 RTOS in the internal ROM.
—N/a	μPD70P322	A microcontroller that can be configured to act as either a NEC V25 or a NEC V35, controlled by an input pin "V25/V̅3̅5̅". Includes a 16 KByte reprogrammable UV EPROM.
NEC V25+	μPD70325	High-speed version of the V25.
NEC V25 Security Guard	μPD70327	A version of the NEC V25 that adds "Security Guard", a security mode where instruction opcode bytes are translated during fetch/decode using a 256-entry customer-defined lookup table stored in an on-chip Mask ROM, allowing it to execute code encrypted with an 8-bit Substitution cipher. This security mode can be enabled/disabled at runtime with the "Security Guard"-specific instructions BRKS and BRKN.
NEC V35	μPD70330	A microcontroller version of the NEC V30. The μPD70332 variant includes a 16 KByte on-chip mask ROM that is not present in the μPD70330.
NEC V35	μPD70332	A microcontroller version of the NEC V30. The μPD70332 variant includes a 16 KByte on-chip mask ROM that is not present in the μPD70330.
NEC V35HS	μPD79021	A version of the V35 with the RX116 RTOS in the internal ROM.
NEC V35+	μPD70335	A high-speed version of the V35.
NEC V35 Security Guard	μPD70337	A version of the V35 that adds "Security Guard", similar to μPD70327.
NEC V55PI	μPD70433	The V55PI has extended segment registers called DS2 and DS3, and by shifting the register value by 8 bits to the left and adding an offset value, it is possible to access the entire 16MB address space.
NEC V55SC	μPD70423	The V55SC not only comes with extended segment registers, called DS2 and DS3, but is also furnished with a two-channel Multi Protocol Serial Controller (MPSC) which is subset of μPD72001/72002.
ASIC/macrocell variants
NEC V30MX	—N/a	A variant of V30 designed for use as a macrocell. Uses separate buses for addresses and data. Used in numerous products, e.g. Vadem VG330 (see below), Psion Series 3MX and Casio Algebra FX Series.
NEC V30MT	—N/a	Lower-power variant of the V30MX.
NEC V30MZ	—N/a	Pipelined variant of the V30, achieving 1 cycle per instruction for many common instructions. Used in numerous products, e.g. Bandai's handheld WonderSwan game console, Casio's Pocket Viewer, and NEC's own μPD720130/μPD720133 USB 2.0 to IDE bridge chips.
NEC V30MZC	—N/a	Variant of the V30MZ with an added 4 KByte cache.
Other/related products
Vadem VG230	—N/a	A single-chip PC platform. The VG230 contained a 16 MHz NEC V30HL processor and IBM PC/XT-compatible core logic, LCD controller (CGA/AT&T640x400) with touch-plane support, keyboard matrix scanner, dual PCMCIA 2.1 card controller, EMS 4.0 hardware support for up to 64 MB, and built-in timer, PIC, DMA, UART and RTC controllers. It was used in the HP OmniGo 100, 120 and IBM Simon.
Vadem VG330	—N/a	Successor to the VG230, it contained a 32 MHz NEC V30MX processor and IBM PC/AT-compatible core logic with dual PICs, LCD controller (640x480), keyboard matrix scanner, PC Card ExCA 2.1 controller and SIR port.
NEC V60	μPD70616	With the V60 processor, NEC departed from the x86 design and launched a new, 32-bit CISC architecture. The V60 and the V70, which differed mainly in the widths of their respective external address and data buses, both included a V20/V30 emulation mode. (The later V80, which used the same CISC architecture, did not include the V20/V30 emulation mode.)
NEC V70	μPD70632	With the V60 processor, NEC departed from the x86 design and launched a new, 32-bit CISC architecture. The V60 and the V70, which differed mainly in the widths of their respective external address and data buses, both included a V20/V30 emulation mode. (The later V80, which used the same CISC architecture, did not include the V20/V30 emulation mode.)

Die photos

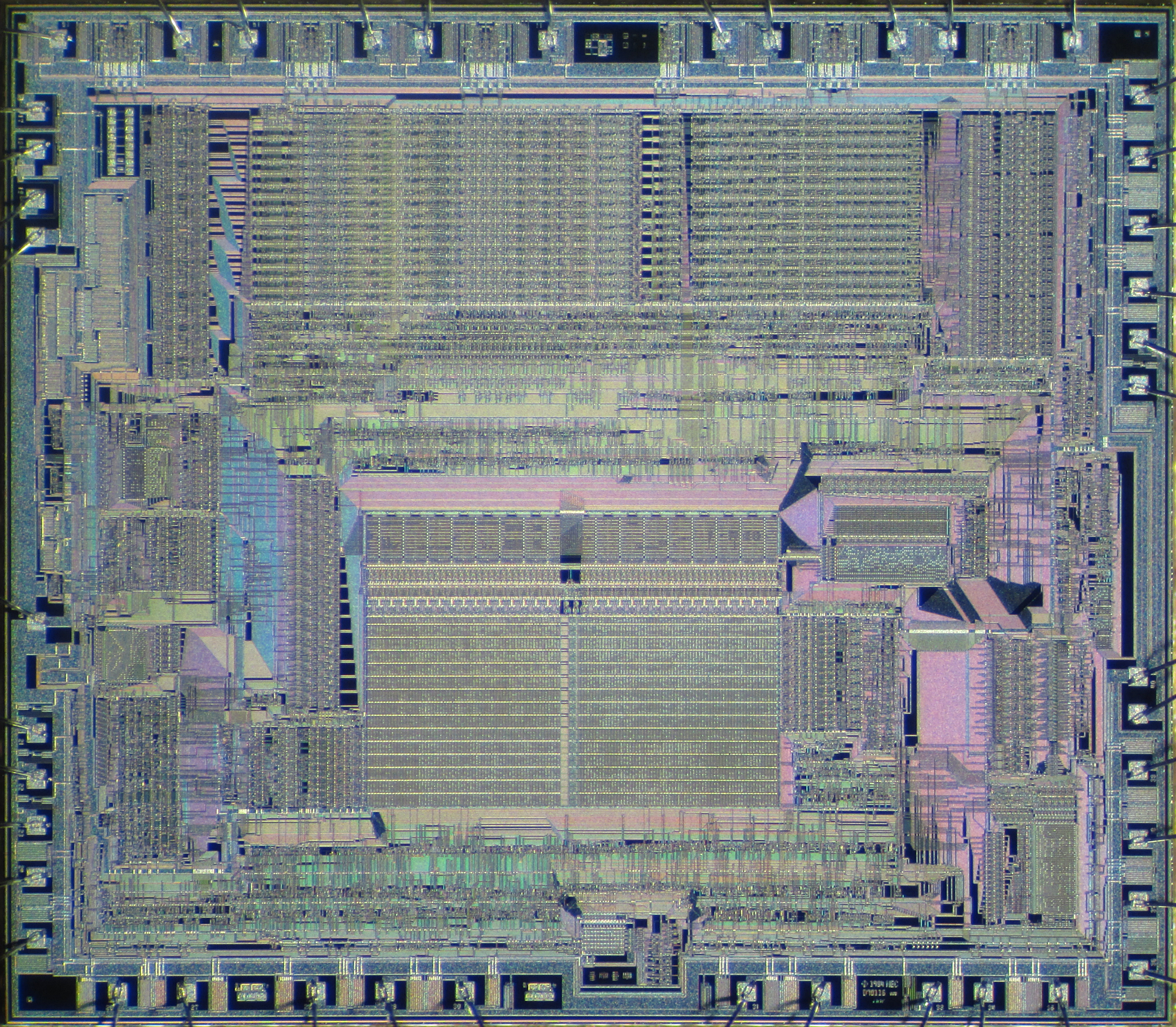
NEC V30

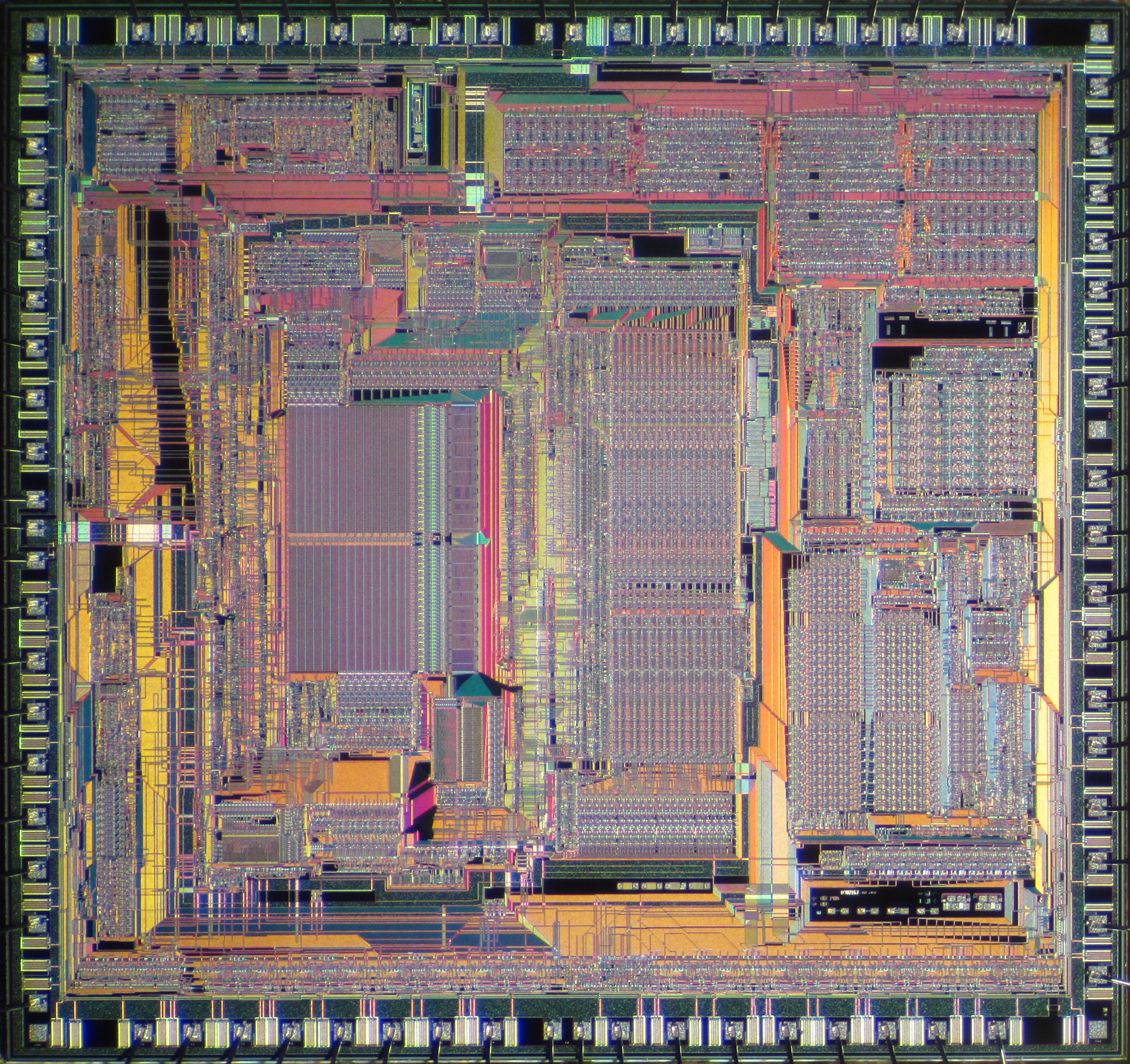
NEC V50

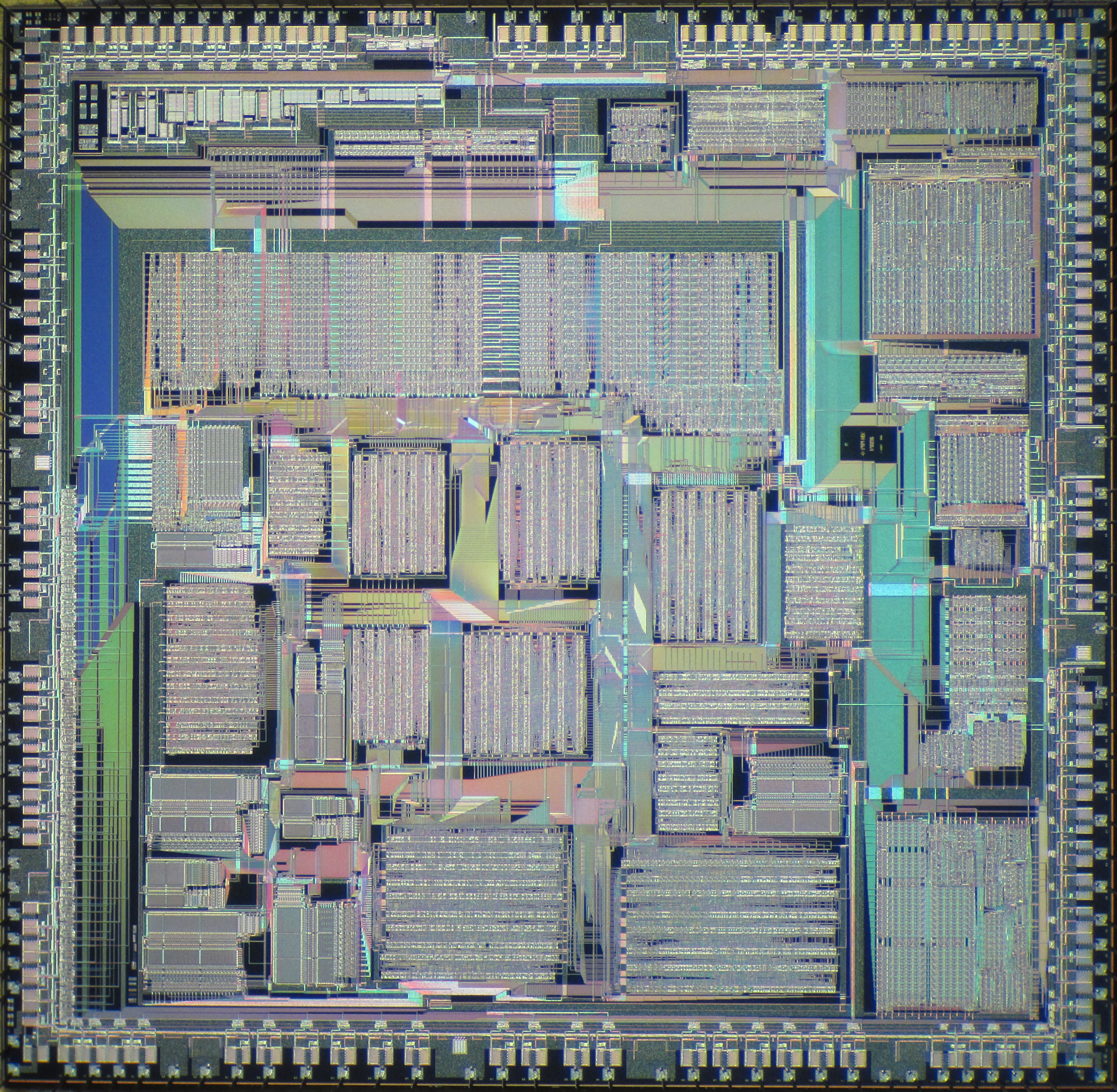
NEC V53

== See also ==
- NEC RX116, dedicated ITRON-1-based 16-bit RTOS
- NEC μPD9002, a Z80 and x86 compatible CPU
- VIA Technologies Alternate Instruction Set, a CPU implementing a similar scheme to enter and exit into an alternate instruction set mode
