= Vadem =

Defunct American computer company

Vadem Limited
- Formerly: Vadem Inc. (1983–1999)
- Type: Private
- Industry: Computer
- Founded: 1983; 43 years ago in San Jose, California
- Founders: Henry Fung; Chikok Shing
- Defunct: 2013; 13 years ago
- Fate: Dissolution
- Products: Vadem Clio
- Number of employees: 45 (1997)

Vadem Inc., later Vadem Limited, was an American original design manufacturer, chipset designer, and computer design firm active from 1983 to 2013. The company chiefly focused on the design of mobile computers such as laptops, rendering their services to companies such as IBM, Zenith Data Systems, Osborne Computer Corporation, and Sharp Corporation, among others. In the late 1990s, the company released their own branded product, the Vadem Clio, a PDA.

== History ==
=== Foundation and early success (1983–1987) ===
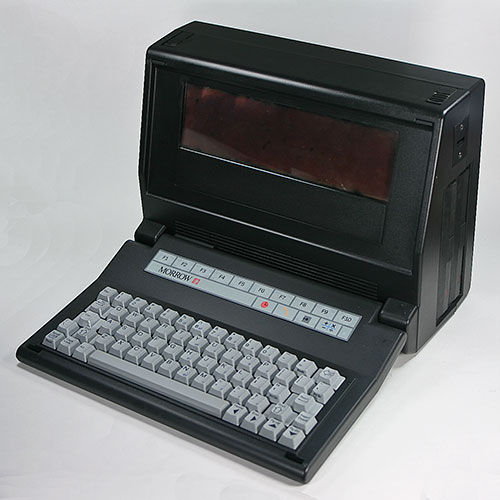
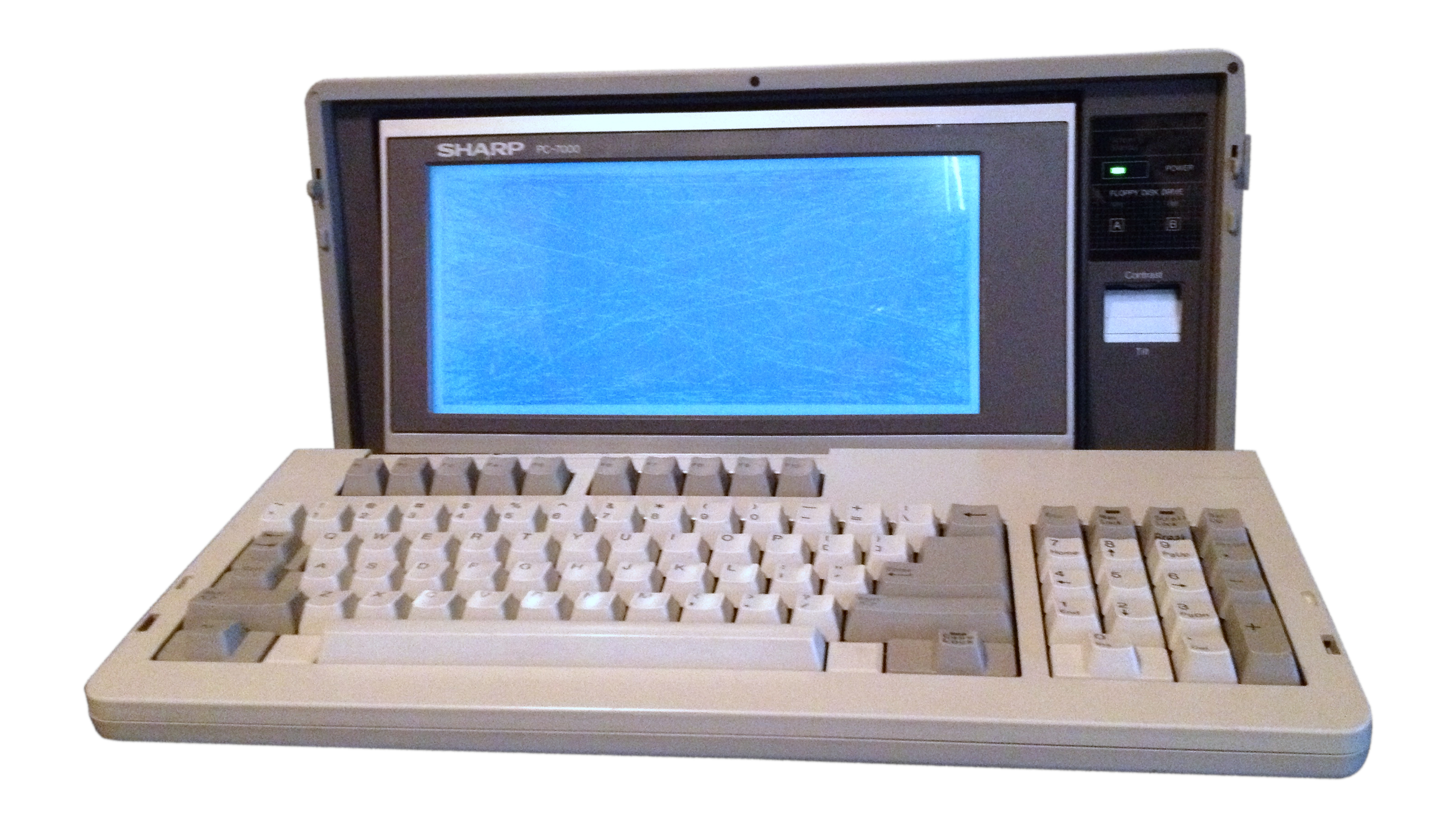
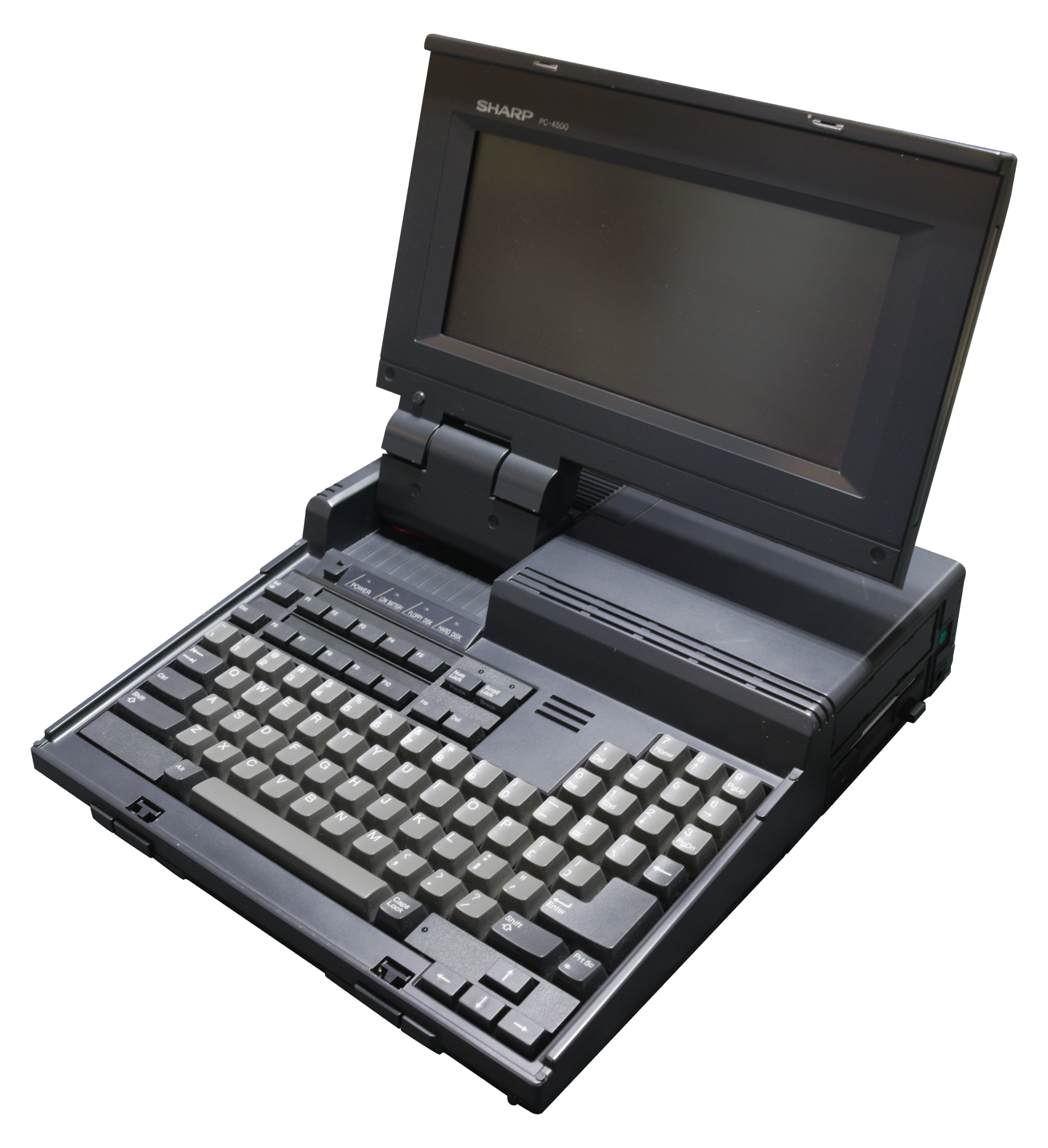
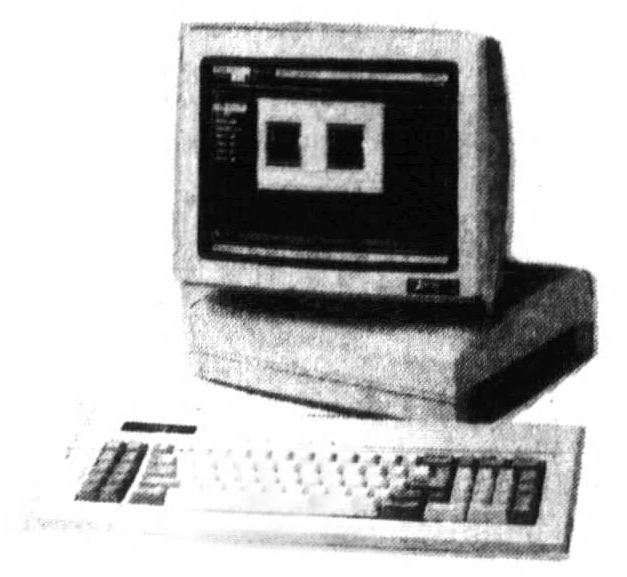
A sample of personal computers designed by Vadem; counterclockwise from top left: Morrow Pivot (1984), Sharp PC-7000 (1985), Zenith Eazy PC (1987), Sharp PC-4521 (1988).

Vadem Inc. was founded by Henry Fung and Chikok Shing in San Jose, California, in 1983. Fung had previously worked for Intel as an engineer, while Shing had worked for the Osborne Computer Corporation, which had filed for Chapter 11 bankruptcy around the time of Vadem's incorporation. The company's name derives from the term vade mecum, synonymous with "handbook".

The company's first project was designing a portable computer for Morrow Designs, a computer systems manufacturer based in Silicon Valley, headed by George Morrow. The design was eventually realized as the Morrow Pivot, one of the first battery-powered MS-DOS compatible portable computers, in 1984. Morrow provided Vadem with under $3 million in seed money in exchange for the design.

As Morrow had signed a non-exclusive agreement with Vadem to use the computer's design, Vadem later sold the rights to the design to the recently reorganized Osborne Computer Corporation, who marketed it as the Osborne III computer in 1984. Later, in 1985, Vadem's Shing designed the lunchbox-sized Morrow Pivot II for Morrow, this time under an exclusivity agreement. Morrow themselves sold the rights for the Pivot II design to Zenith Data Systems, who released it as the Zenith Z-171. The Z-171 sold immensely well for Zenith Data Systems, the latter shocking industry observers in early 1986 when it was awarded a contract to sell 20,000 Z-171s worth $27 million to the IRS, beating out IBM and their PC Convertible.

In 1985, Sharp Corporation hired Vadem for the design of the PC-7000, their first fully IBM PC compatible portable computer. In 1987, they recommissioned Vadem for a successor laptop, the PC-4500. Zenith themselves later hired Vadem for the design of their all-in-one Eazy PC, in 1987.

=== Chipsets and Intel partnership (1987–1994) ===
The company posted profits in the fiscal years 1986 and 1987. By 1988, Vadem occupied a 6,000-square-foot research and development facility San Jose, employed 18 full-time employees and had several freelance consultants on their roster. In the late 1980s, the company began pivoting to designing integrated circuits for application in personal computers and embedded systems, such as solid state disks and LCD controller chips. During this pivot, Vadem found their greatest successes in the PC-compatible chipset market, signing two five-year contracts with Intel in 1988 for the rights to Vadem's designs for a chipset compatible with the IBM PC XT and PS/2 Model 30, in exchange for investment capital and referrals to Vadem from Intel's sales department.

Vadem's Model 30–compatible chipset, dubbed the VG-501/VG-502, comprised two chips and was partially based on Intel's 80186 microprocessor. As the 80186 contains on-chip peripherals that are not normally compatible with those of the IBM PC, the VG-501/VG-502 augments the 80C186's logic by triggering a non-maskable interrupt (NMI) when it detects an attempt to access the PC's interrupt controller, DMA controller, or timer address. A routine inside the chip then performs translations to make the behavior of the 80186's on-chip peripherals align with traditional PC peripherals. In addition, the VG-501/VG-502 contains extra timers and DMA channels and was clocked at 16 MHz, twice as fast as the Model 30's Intel 8086 and rivaling even a 10-MHz Intel 286, according to Vadem. The chip count of a VG-501/502–based system was also lower, compared to traditional 8086-based system, according to ESD magazine. Vadem originally designed the VG-501/VG-502 for Sharp and Zenith to use in their NEC V40–based laptops. The XT-compatible chipset, meanwhile, combined nearly all the motherboard components of a typical PC XT (excluding the processor and RAM). Dubbed the VG-603, it includes all the circuitry necessary to support a parallel printer port, a serial port, a real-time clock, and 50 bytes of scratchpad memory. Both the VG-501/VG-502 and the VG-603 were introduced in November 1988.

Vadem leveraged their experience designing laptops to develop and market the VG-600 LCD controller, which emulates the Motorola 6845 used in many of the IBM PC's standard graphics cards, including MDA, Hercules, and CGA. The VG-600 supports various LCD panels, offers single- and double-scan CGA resolutions with eight grayscale levels, and uses only two 64k×4 DRAMs. Like the aforementioned chipsets, the VG-600 was also introduced in November 1988.

In 1989, Vadem designed for Intel the 82347, a power-management support chip designed for Intel's laptop-oriented i386 variant, the i386SL. In 1990, they released a low-cost, low-power CMOS chipset for the Intel 80186 and NEC V40. In the same year, IBM hired Vadem as a consultant on their PCradio, an early cellular-enabled notebook computer.

Vadem VG-230 system on a chip

In August 1992, the company introduced a complete PC system on a chip intended for the design of subnotebooks and personal digital assistants (PDAs) by OEMs. Called the VG-230 and branded as the "Sub-Notebook Engine", Vadem based this SoC on the NEC V30HL, a 8086-class processor clocked at 16-MHz. In addition to the standard array of PC support circuitry, the SoC integrates a dual PC Card (version 2.1) controller, an LCD controller (supporting dual-scan CGA), a keyboard scanner, and—for pen-enabled devices such as PDAs—a specialized hardware buffer for handwriting input by stylus. This buffer allows the SoC to manipulate handwriting data while the main CPU performs other tasks. The VG-230 was used with many popular mobile devices in the 1990s, including in the OmniGo 100, a palmtop PC by Hewlett-Packard, and in the IBM Simon, considered by many to be the first smartphone ever released. In 1993, Vadem again collaborated with Sharp to design the latter's PT-9000, a tablet-cum-PDA sporting the VG-230 that aimed to compete with Apple's Newton platform. In 1996, Vadem developed a successor SoC called the VG-330, based on the 16-bit, 32-MHz NEC V30MX processor, which in terms of performance compares to an early Intel 386 chip. The VG-330 can display graphics at up to standard VGA resolution (640×480) and contains APM-compliant power management circuitry, added support for Serial Infrared, and more robust touchscreen support.

=== Mobile devices and decline (1994–2013) ===
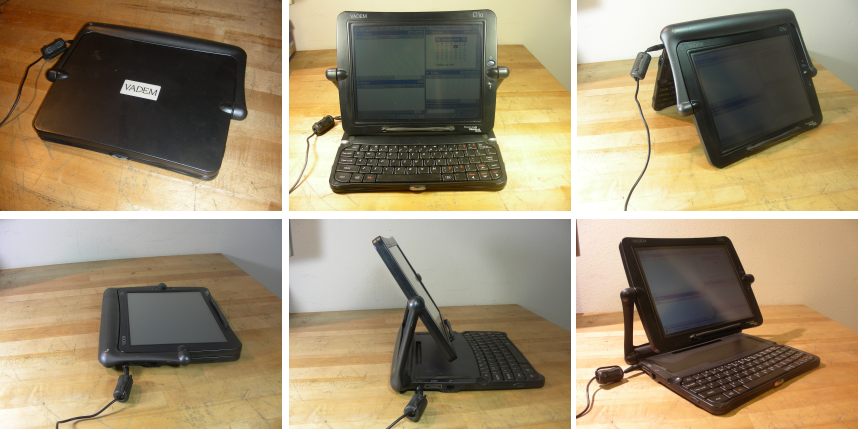
A Vadem Clio from 1998

Vadem expanded to 30 employees in 1994, by which point the company began focusing solely on logic and power-management chipsets for the handheld PC and PDA markets. It had revenues of $21 million in 1995 and was profitable by this time. In 1996, NEC hired Vadem to co-design the MobileGear PDA, based on Windows CE. In late 1998, the company released their own CE-based PDA, the Clio, based on NEC's MIPS VR4111 processor. The Clio was rebranded by Sharp as the Mobilon TriPad in the same year.

Vadem had a peak of 45 employees on its payroll in 1997. The company experienced financial turmoil in 1998 and restructured in 1999, following a purchase of stake in Vadem by Microsoft which saw the company split four ways and reemerge as Vadem, LLC. The latter dissolved in 2013 after having transferred its patents into the various spin-offs, all of which went defunct shortly after their creation.

== See also ==
- List of x86 manufacturers
- Original equipment manufacturer
