= Zenith Eazy PC =

All-in-one IBM PC compatible computer (1987–1990)

Eazy PC

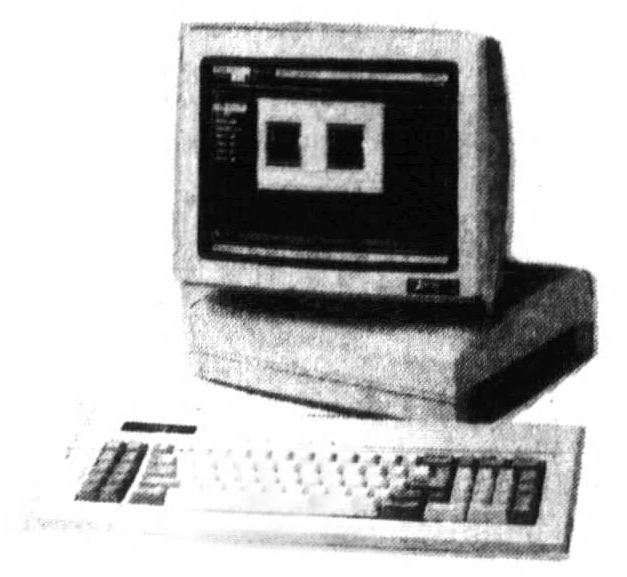
- Developer: Zenith Data Systems; Vadem
- Manufacturer: Zenith Data Systems
- Type: All-in-one
- Generation: First
- Released: July 1987
- Media: One 720 KB 3.5-inch floppy disk drive (Models 1 and 3); Two 720 KB 3.5-inch floppy disk drives (Model 2)
- Operating system: MS-DOS 3.21
- CPU: NEC V40 at 7.16 MHz
- Memory: 512 KB standard; 640 KB with external module
- Storage: 20 MB hard disk (Model 3)
- Display: 14 in (36 cm) CRT
- Graphics: CGA
- Power: 120/220 V AC
- Dimensions: 13 in × 11 in × 3.5 in (33.0 cm × 27.9 cm × 8.9 cm)
- Weight: 28–30 pounds (13–14 kg)

The Eazy PC (stylized as eaZy pc) is an all-in-one IBM PC compatible computer manufactured by Zenith Data Systems (ZDS) starting in 1987. This small-form-factor XT-compatible system has some distinctive features, such as using an NEC V40 CPU. The Eazy PC was designed to be a simple, cost-effective computer for the home. This was a departure for ZDS, who had historically avoided the retail consumer market to focus on customers such as businesses, universities, and government agencies.

== Specifications ==
=== Construction and components ===
The Eazy PC is an all-in-one system: the CRT monitor and its tilt/swivel base are permanently attached to the base unit and cannot be upgraded. The monitor also houses the computer's power supply. The screen measures 14 inches (36 cm) diagonally. It generates only a gray scale display, using a warm white phosphor. The graphics chip supports CGA video with a maximum resolution of 640 by 200 pixels which is double-scanned to 400 vertical pixel resolution, providing crisp characters in text mode.

The lower case holding the mainboard measures 13 by 11 by 3.5 inches (33.0 cm × 27.9 cm × 8.9 cm) in width, depth, and height, respectively. The single or dual 3.5-inch floppy drives are accessed from the computer's right side. The included detached keyboard plugs into a 5-pin DIN connector on the left side.

On the rear of the system unit are a DE-09M port for a serial mouse, a DB-25F parallel port, and a proprietary "option" port that is a 64-pin two row pin header for external modules. The mouse port is a serial port with functions unnecessary for mouse operation disabled.

The CPU in the Eazy PC is an NEC V40 microprocessor running at a clock speed of 7.16 MHz, but able to be slowed to the 4.77 MHz speed of a standard XT. Like the NEC V20, the V40 is object-code compatible with the Intel 8088, but the V40 includes some integrated peripherals that would otherwise require additional circuitry on the mainboard. Base system memory is 512 KB of RAM. The BIOS used was both designed and supplied by Vadem.

The mainboard was noteworthy among contemporary IBM PC compatible systems of its class for its extensive use of large-scale integration (LSI) ICs and low-power CMOS chips—as ZDS had been using in their portable computers. Locating the system power supply inside the monitor permitted a smaller mainboard enclosure.

ZDS offered the Eazy PC in three configurations:

- Model 1: Also called the EZ1, this version came with one 720 KB 3.5-inch floppy disk drive.
- Model 2: Also called the EZ2, this version came with two 720 KB 3.5-inch floppy drives.
- Model 3: Also called the EZ3, EZ20, and Model 20, this version came with one floppy disk drive and a 20 MB hard disk drive.

Once purchased, the configuration of the drives could not be modified—even to add a second floppy drive to a Model 1—except by ZDS themselves. Models 1 and 2 were equipped with lower-wattage power supplies unable to support the addition of a hard drive. The components inside Models 1 and 2 were also arranged differently from the Model 3, in a way that makes it impossible to install an aftermarket hard drive.

=== Expansion ===
Unlike most other PC compatibles, there are no internal ISA expansion slots. Omitting these slots, combined with the use of LSI and CMOS electronics, kept the system's total power dissipation low enough to eliminate the need for a cooling fan, resulting in quieter operation. Besides the absence of expansion slots, the Eazy PC's mainboard lacked a socket for a floating-point unit like the Intel 8087.

The Eazy PC's only aftermarket options were sold by ZDS, and included a mouse, an internal real-time clock module, and two external modules. External modules have metal enclosures and plug into the rear option port, extending the depth of the computer's case by 2.5 inches (6.4 cm). One module expanded the RAM by 128 KB to the supported maximum of 640 KB. The other module included the additional memory, and added a 9-pin serial port and a 300/1200 bit/s modem with a 6P2C RJ11 socket. Only one external module could be attached at a time.

=== Software ===
The Eazy PC came bundled with MS-DOS 3.21, GW-BASIC, and version 1 of MS-DOS Manager, a character-based windowing file manager described as a precursor to the later DOS Shell. When configured to stay resident in memory, MS-DOS Manager uses at least 111 KB, preventing some larger applications—in InfoWorld writer Lewis Perdue's experience, MultiMate Advantage—from working at all without the 128 KB provided by the expansion modules. The same reviewer also reported difficulty running certain applications from floppy disk without the computer freezing, throwing errors, or failing to boot—deeming the Eazy PC not fully IBM PC compatible in his summary of the machine.

== Development and marketing ==
The Eazy PC was designed and developed by Zenith Data Systems and Vadem, the latter being an original design manufacturer based in San Jose, California. ZDS announced the product in early June 1987 at the Spring COMDEX in Atlanta, Georgia. It went on sale one month later.

ZDS marketed the Eazy PC as an "entry-level machine", suitable for "novice or first-time computer users" and "business executives who bring work home". This was the company's first effort to attract a base of consumers who had rarely or never used a computer before. ZDS had previously earned a reputation in the computer industry for producing high performance systems—especially portables—and were a major supplier to governments and institutions. Initial pricing in the United States ranged from $999 to $1699 ($2,831 to $4,815 in 2025 dollars), depending on the configuration chosen. The memory–serial–modem expansion module—which one reviewer considered necessary for the PC to be useful at all—cost an additional $399 (equivalent to $1,131 in 2025).

ZDS discontinued the Eazy PC in early 1990. At least one discount catalog company, Damark, offered the Eazy PC with the hard drive configuration for $669 (equivalent to $1,649 in 2025) as late as September 1990.

== Reception ==
Daniel Brogan of the Chicago Tribune conducted a benchmark of several IBM PC compatibles' ability to handle calculating "the liability of a pension plan covering 1,000 workers" based on an algorithm used by a high-ranking actuarial consulting firm. He found that the Eazy PC ranked second-to-last place, beating only the Leading Edge Model D, finishing its calculating at just under 51 minutes—almost 20 minutes faster than the Model D but over 20 minutes slower than the AT&T 6300.

The Zenith Data Systems Eazy PC is anything but. In fact, associating the word "easy" with this computer is dangerously misleading.

— Lewis Perdue, in InfoWorld

Perdue criticized the Eazy PC as "neither simple enough for novices nor powerful enough for business users", and strongly disliked the lack of upgradability. Except for word processing, he found the Eazy PC inadequate for any other purpose, citing its instability when testing several popular IBM PC programs on it and lack of support for local area networks—severely limiting its usefulness in schools and businesses. Perdue wrote that the memory–serial–modem module performed well but suffered from a loose connection to the main chassis due to the thumbscrews attaching it being too short. He also called the built-in monitor's grayscale rendering poor, requiring constant adjustment of the contrast knob to read text between the interfaces of different programs. The only high mark Perdue gave the system was in setup—he was able to unpack and get the Eazy PC running in roughly 10 minutes.

In contrast, PC Magazine writer Robert Aarons praised the Eazy PC as well-designed, remarking that the case holding the system board could be mistaken for a "fancy monitor stand" and calling ZDS courageous for making a PC clone lacking the visual hallmarks of one. Aarons called the monitor "the most eye-pleasing display you've ever seen". Although he found the Eazy PC's processing speed slightly lower than those of other computers with a similar CPU and RAM and its hard drive the slowest in its class, second to IBM's PS/2 Model 25, he rated it a good value for college students, casual home users and office users with minimal needs. Cristine Bye of the Calgary Herald liked the hue of the monitor's phosphor but observed blurriness in its rendering of text. Robert Lander of Your Computer commended ZDS for adopting 3.5-inch disks for the Eazy PC, calling the decision forward-thinking, and expressed appreciation for its industrial design and the quality of its monitor and keyboard. Like Perdue, he criticized the computer's lack of expansion, and like Aarons he found the hard drive of the Model 3 slow when programs wrote to it. Robert Scibilia of Popular Mechanics likened the Eazy PC to the Macintosh: "a simple 1-box computing appliance that does its job with a minimum of fuss".
