= Sharp PC-7000 =

Luggable portable computer

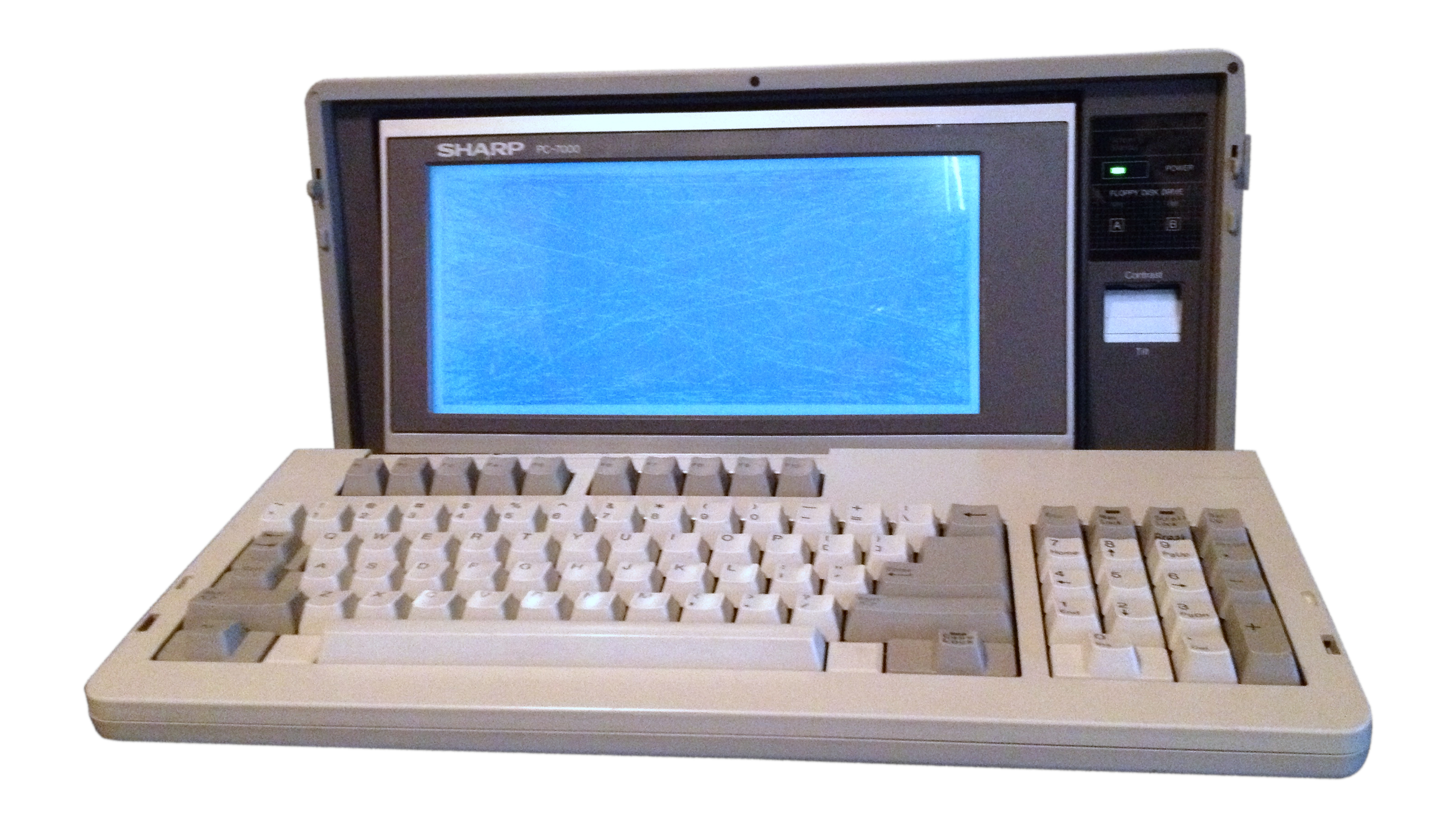
- Sharp PC-7000 running a GW-BASIC program
- Developer: Sharp Electronics; Vadem
- Manufacturer: Sharp Electronics
- Type: Luggable portable computer
- Generation: First
- Released: October 1985; 40 years ago
- Lifespan: Oct. 1985 - 1990 (at least 4 years)
- Discontinued: 1990; 36 years ago
- Units sold: Hundreds of thousands
- Media: Two 5.25-in 360 KB floppy drives
- Operating system: MS-DOS 2.11
- CPU: Intel 8086 at 4.77 or 7.37 MHz
- Memory: 384 KB standard (320 KB usable); 704 KB with expansion card (640 KB usable)
- Storage: 10 MB hard disk drive (optional with expansion unit)
- Display: 10.5 in (2.1:1 aspect ratio) super-twisted nematic LCD
- Power: 120/220 V AC
- Dimensions: 16 in × 8.5 in × 6 in (41 cm × 22 cm × 15 cm)
- Weight: 19 pounds (8.6 kg)
- Predecessor: Sharp PC-5000
- Successor: Sharp PC-4500

The Sharp PC-7000 is a luggable portable computer released by Sharp Electronics in 1985. The PC-7000 was Sharp's second entry into the IBM PC-compatible portable computer market, their first being the PC-5000.

The PC-7000 eschewed the PC-5000's clamshell design, battery operation, and lighter weight—19 pounds (8.6 kg) for the PC-7000 versus the PC-5000's 11 pounds (5.0 kg). The compromise was an LCD with electroluminescent backlighting, as well as an increased display line count—25 for the PC-7000 versus the PC-5000's eight. Sharp also replaced the predecessor's Intel 8088 processor with an 8086 running at a user-switchable 7.37 MHz and bumped the stock memory from 128 to 320 KB. These improvements led to higher performance and near-true IBM PC compatibility, in turn leading to a wider range of software that could be used with the computer.

Sharp released the PC-7000 in October 1985 to high praise. It spawned a series of luggable computers featuring improvements to the original PC-7000's hardware. Sharp sold hundreds of thousands of units under this series—including the original—over the years, before discontinuing it in 1990.

== Specifications ==
=== Construction ===
The Sharp PC-7000's case sports the luggable form factor for portable computers; journalists compared it to a portable radio, a toaster, and a lunchbox. Its keyboard detaches from the display and serves as protection of the latter. The computer's case measures 16 by 8.5 by 6 inches (41 by 22 by 15 cm) and weighs almost 19 pounds (8.6 kg). The computer's chassis was fabricated from steel and provides much of the weight.

The PC-7000's dimensions, when closed, were compliant with the contemporaneously revised restrictions on carry-on luggage set by the Federal Aviation Administration. The same was true even with the computer's optional printer attached. To further assist travelers, Sharp offered a carrying case through mail order.

=== Components ===
On the right side of the Sharp PC-7000 are two half-height, 5.25-inch floppy disk drives, mounted vertically and with shock absorption. These drives were manufactured by Canon and were designed as one piece, making it impossible to replace the unit with a hard disk drive while retaining one of the original floppy disk drives. On the back of the computer are ports for parallel and RS-232 serial. Additional ports for RGBA video output and an internal modem—should these parts have been ordered—are also located on the back.

The PC-7000 uses an Intel 8086 processor, by default running at clock speed of 7.37 MHz, switchable to the IBM PC standard 4.77 MHz. A stock PC-7000 comes with 384 KB of RAM, only 320 KB of which is available to the user. Sharp offered through mail order a memory expansion card which increases the RAM to 704 KB with 640 KB available to the user. A socket for a 8087 coprocessor is included on the mainboard.

The PC-7000's display measures 10.5 inches (27 cm) diagonally with an aspect ratio of 2.1:1. Its display resolution is 640 by 200 pixels, making it compatible with up to the CGA standard only. The portable computer was one of the first to adopt electroluminescent backlighting, at a time when most other LCD screens on portable computer monitors relied on large amounts of ambient lighting for visibility. To further increase this visibility among its competitors, the PC-7000's display can be tilted at angles of 5, 10, and 15 degrees, to accommodate for the user's display contrast preference. Sharp measured the display's half-life at 1,000 hours, at which point the display will lose half its brightness. The display is removable, and Sharp provided replacement displays through mail order for US$49 (equivalent to $150 in 2025). Sharp also provided the option to replace the default white backlighting element with a green element.

Sharp included a BIOS setup utility in ROM, allowing the user to set the time and date of the computer's internal clock and calendar; to invert the display's colors; and to switch between clock speeds, among other parameters. In addition, the user can adjust the backlighting intensity through this utility, as well as the duration of time after which the backlighting shuts off while the computer remains idle. These latter two settings preserve the life of the backlighting: when the backlighting is shut off, a lamp illuminates an indicator on the panel to the right of the screen. An internal fan keeps the power supply cool.

=== Expansion ===
Along with the aforementioned 8087 coprocessor and RAM expansion options, users could also have ordered a proprietary video card allowing them to hook up an external monitor with RGBA input to the computer. A Hayes-compatible internal modem operating at 300 or 1200 baud was another option, as was an expansion unit that provided a 10 MB hard drive and three ISA expansion slots.

Yet another option was a thermal-transfer printer, named the CE-700P, that clips onto the bottom of the computer and connects to its parallel port. The CE-700P is capable of printing graphics at 480 dpi as well as onto transparency foil directly, as well as normal printer paper. The printer also supports landscape orientation and multiple typefaces.

== Development and release ==
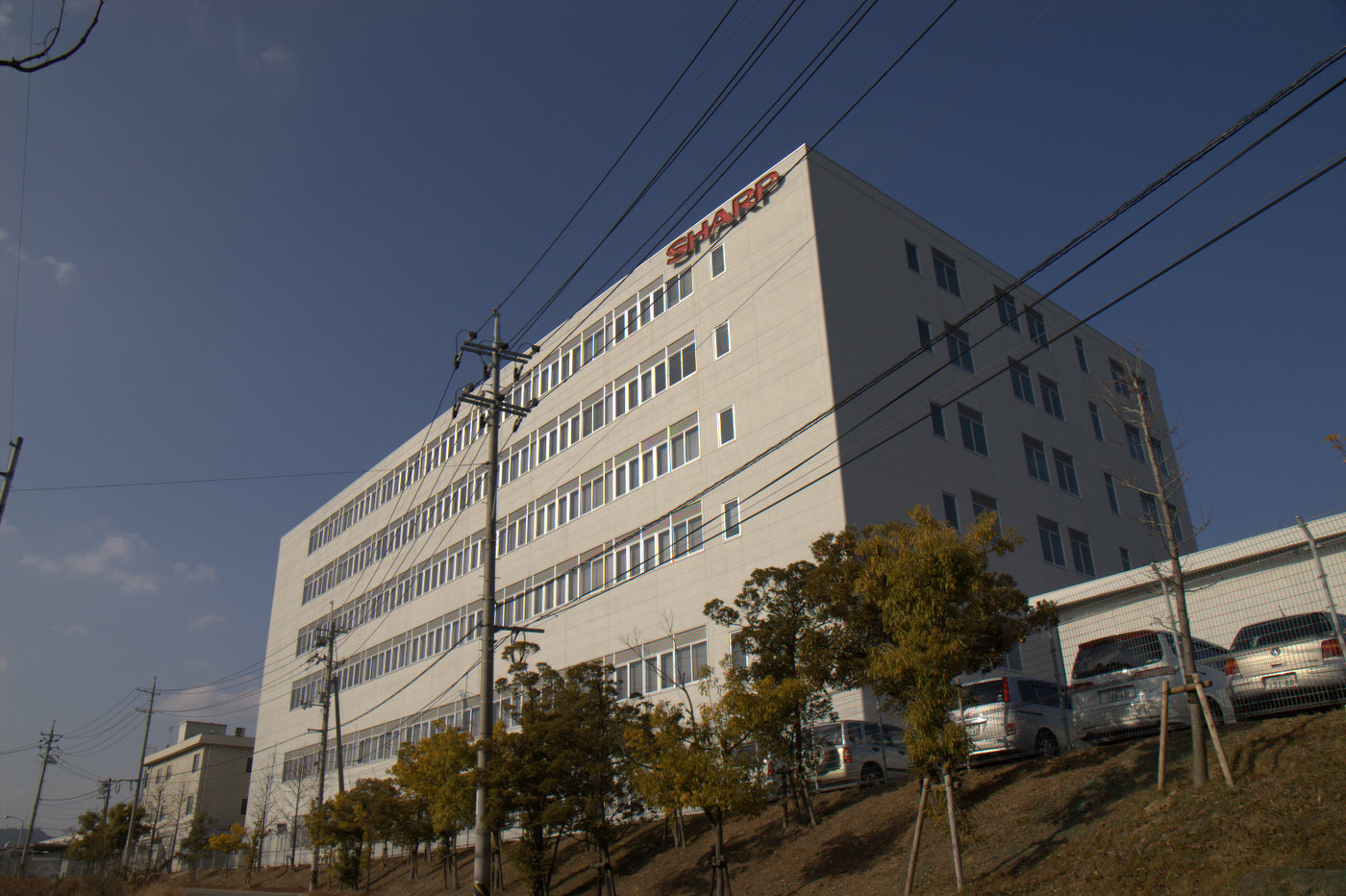
The Hiroshima factory of Sharp Electronics

Designing the PC-7000 was a joint effort from Sharp Electronics and Vadem, an original design manufacturer based in San Jose. Final manufacturing was done by Sharp in Japan. Later revisions of the computer, starting in 1988, were manufactured in the United States in Memphis, in a factory that also produced Sharp's television sets and microwave ovens.

Sharp released the PC-7000 in October 1985. The company had previously revealed the PC-7000 in July that year, at a trade show hosted by the National Office Machine Dealers Association, in Las Vegas. The PC-7000 initially competed with heavier luggable portable computers such as Compaq's Portable 286 and Panasonic's Executive Partner—the latter two weighing almost 28 pounds (13 kg). It later competed with IBM's first laptop computer, the PC Convertible; Compaq's slimmed-down version of the Portable 286, the Portable II; and Toshiba's first IBM PC-compatible laptop computer, the T1100, among other portable computers. Its initial cost in the United States was $1,795 ($5,373 in 2017). Betsy Staples, editor of Creative Computing, predicted that its sub-$2000 price would make its future "rosy" in the PC clone market.

== Reception ==
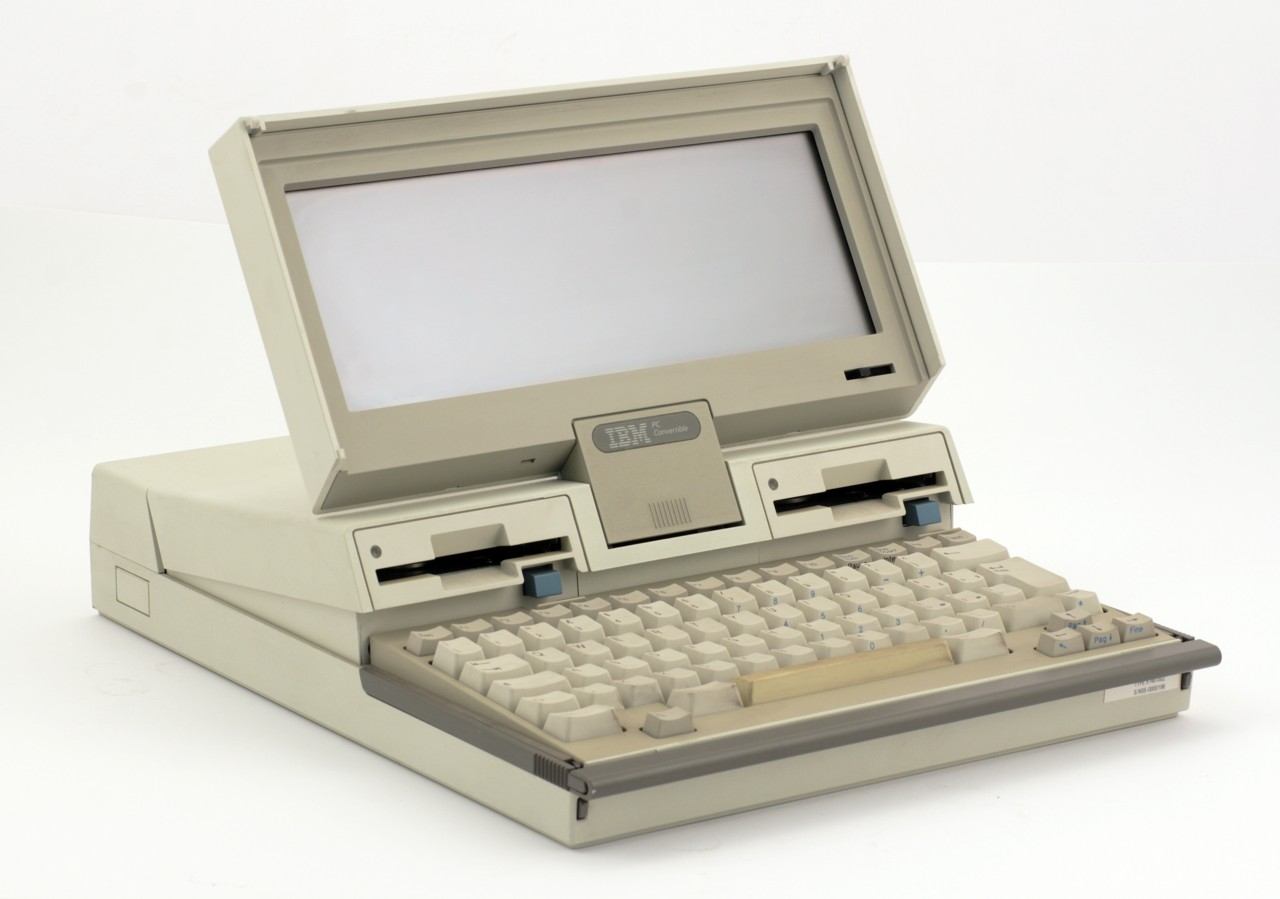
The IBM PC Convertible, a competitor to the PC-7000

The PC-7000 received high praise on release, with Sharp selling hundreds of thousands of units—this figure including sales of later models—globally over the years. George Brett, a journalist for the Toronto Star, preferred the Sharp PC-7000 over IBM's PC Convertible for retaining the then-widespread 5.25-inch floppy disk drives, costing less in its stock configuration while also having more memory, and backlighting the display. In comparison, Brett found IBM's adoption of 3.5-inch floppy disk drives as the exclusive media format of the Convertible poorly conceived and its display unreadable. Michael Heck, a freelance writer for Pico's Journal of Briefcase Computing found the PC-7000's size unobtrusive and its 19-pound weight fair for its capabilities over other portable computers. He ultimately praised the computer's communications support, near-full IBM PC compatibility, and display.

Phil Casella, a software developer and an InfoWorld writer, called the PC-7000 well-performing, easy to use, to set up, and to service, and rated it a good value. In particular, Casella praised the computer's sturdy construction and case design and defined the display as "one of the best" LCDs his magazine staff had seen at the time of his review. Alfred Poor, a freelance writer for PC Magazine, also praised the construction and display, while holding reservation with the keyboard's lack of tactile feedback and moderate heft of the entire computer. Fellow PC Magazine writer Bill Machrone felt that the physical dimensions of the PC-7000 sat awkwardly between IBM's lightweight PC Convertible and Compaq's heavy but full-featured Portable II. Machrone also found fault with the LCD's weak contrast.

== Legacy ==
From its introduction in 1985, the PC-7000's praise and steady sales encouraged the increased use of LCDs in portable computers.

The original PC-7000 gave way to subsequent models—the PC-7000A, the PC-7100, the PC-7201, the PC-7221, and the PC-7241—all of which retain the luggable form factor. In 1987, Sharp recommissioned Vadem to produce the successor to the PC-7000 line, the Sharp PC-4500. This series of portables were in the laptop form factor, unlike the lunchbox PC-7000, and were released alongside the successor models in the PC-7000 line. The PC-7000 series was discontinued in around 1990.

An original PC-7000 is housed in the Rhode Island Computer Museum.
