= Vadem Clio =

Clio
- Vadem Clio model C-1000, from 1998
- Also known as: Sharp Mobilon TriPad
- Developer: Vadem
- Manufacturer: Vadem
- Type: Handheld PC
- Released: 1998
- Operating system: Windows CE
- CPU: NEC VR4111 at 84 MHz (C-1000); NEC VR4121 at 168 MHz (C-1050)

The Vadem Clio is a handheld PC released by Vadem in late 1998. The Clio is based on an NEC MIPS VR4111 processor. All models use Windows CE H/PC Pro 3.0 (WinCE Core OS 2.11) as the operating system.

The Clio was rebranded by Sharp as the Mobilon TriPad in 1999. Data Evolution Corporation currently owns the rights to the Clio.

== Overview ==
Three-quarter view of Clio C-1000, showing "SwingTop" pivoting arm

Clio C-1000 pivoted into a desktop tablet configuration

The Clio is a convertible tablet computer released by Vadem and designed by Sohela. The platform was conceived of and created within Vadem by a skunkworks team led by Edmond Ku. Clio was first developed without the knowledge of Microsoft, and after it was presented to Bill Gates and the CE team, it led to the definition of the Jupiter-class CE platform.

The Clio's "SwingTop" has a pivoting arm with a 180-degree screen rotation. The Clio could run for 12 hours on a single charge. It is measured to be around an inch (2.2 cm) thick.

Handwriting software was from Vadem's ParaGraph group (acquired from SGI), the same team that provided handwriting recognition technology used in the Apple Newton.

== Design ==
The swing arm and rotating screen concept was conceived by Edmond Ku, Vadem's engineering director. The physical design was the creation of Frog Design's industrial designers Sonia Schieffer and Josh Morenstein and mechanical engineers Richard Huang and Jenny Schlee.

The enclosure was made from plastic injection-molded carbon fiber-reinforced polyamide (nylon). The swing arm was die-cast aluminium for stiffness and strength. The video signals relied on a double-sided flex circuit that routed from the base up through the arm to the display panel.

== Specifications ==
=== C-1000 ===
- Processor: NEC VR4111 (MIPS R4000-compatible) 84 MHz
- ROM: 24 MiB (upgradable)
- SDRAM: 16 MiB (upgradable to 32)
- Display: 9.4" 640 × 480 DSTN, 256 colors, touch panel
- Software screen Rotation: None
- Contrast and Brightness Settings: Yes
- Keyboard: 63 Key, US English—16.5 mm center-to-center
- Battery: 12-hour lithium ion rechargeable battery pack
- Power Supply: 120 volts
- Ports:
  - 1 × RS-232 serial port (Not built-in, available on travel dock only)
  - 1 × Type II PC Card
  - 1 × Type II Compact Flash (internal)
- Modem: 33.6 kbit/s Lucent
- IrDA support: SIR and FIR
- Speaker
- Microphone
- Size/Physical Dimensions: 8.75 in × 11.25 in × 1 in
- Weight: 3 lb., 5 oz. (Includes batteries and AC adapter)

=== C-1050 ===
- Processor: NEC VR4121 (MIPS R4000-compatible) 168 MHz
- ROM: 24 MiB (upgradable)
- SDRAM: 32 MiB
- Display: 9.4" 640 × 480 DSTN, 65,000 colors, touch panel
- Screen Rotation: 0–180° (90° and 270° screen orientation supported)
- Contrast and Brightness Settings: Yes
- Keyboard: 63 Key, US English—16.5 mm center-to-center
- Battery: 10 hour lithium ion rechargeable battery pack
- Power Supply: 120 volts
- Ports:
  - 1 × RS-232 serial port (Not built-in, available on travel dock only)
  - 1 × Type II PC Card
  - 1 × Type II Compact Flash (internal)
- Modem: 56 kbit/s V.90 Lucent
- IrDA support: SIR and FIR
- Speaker
- Microphone
- Size/Physical Dimensions: 8.75 in × 11.25 in × 1 in
- Weight: 3 lb., 5 oz. (Includes batteries and AC adapter)

== See also ==
- ActiveSync
- Personal digital assistant
- SuperWaba
