= IBM HandShaker =

File manager

- IBM HandShaker 7.5, system floppy disk of IBM DOS 2.1, file manager mode with ASCII table, calendar, and calculator
- Developer: KHEMZ Inc.
- Stable release: 7.5 – IBM HandShaker; 8.0 – Connect Commander / 1999 — IBM HandShaker; 2001 — Connect Commander
- Written in: Pascal, Turbo Vision
- Operating system: DOS, OS/2
- Available in: Russian, English
- Type: Orthodox file manager
- License: Freeware
- Website: web.archive.org/web/19980113061512/www.infocom.kharkov.ua/support/cn/

IBM HandShaker (also known as Connect Commander or simply CN) is a file manager for the DOS operating system, developed in 1991. It supported both Russian and English user interfaces, featured a built-in screensaver, and was widely used by professional programmers as a replacement for DOS Shell, due to its numerous extended capabilities.

== History ==
The software was developed in Kharkiv, Ukraine, by programmers Yan Balter and Dmitry Orlov starting in 1991. The final version of IBM HandShaker (7.5) was released in 1999, and an alternate version under the name Connect Commander (8.0) appeared in 2001. The last version of Connect Commander was released in December 2005.

== Description ==
Initially conceived as an integrated development environment for embedded systems and hardware programming, IBM HandShaker eventually became a file manager featuring a primitive built-in scripting language and debugger. Like DOS Navigator, it was written in Turbo Pascal using the Turbo Vision framework.

== Features ==
- File manager in the style of Norton Commander, with advanced support for treating directories as files and archives as directories. (Note: Features included optimal file placement when copying to removable media, file splitting, flexible file panel resizing, auto-adjustment of the directory tree, file selection retention, advanced search across disks and inside archives by mask, size, date, attributes, or content, file operations on search results, color highlighting and sorting by masks, directory tree flattening, history of all input strings, launcher system based on file masks, and external viewer configuration.)
- Multi-window text editor comparable to MultiEdit;
- Multi-window hex editor;
- dBase-compatible database support with regex-based search, field editing, record deletion, memo field viewing (text and hex), clipboard interaction;
- Compiler for the internal scripting language to control the text editor and terminal emulator;
- Keyboard macro editor;
- Terminal emulator with ANSI.SYS compatibility and background operation;
- Phonebook with modem-based autodialing;
- Auxiliary tools (programmer's calculator, disassembler, memory editor, alarm clock, calendar, ASCII table, background printing system with customizable fonts, CD player);
- Context-sensitive, extensible help system with regex search, cross-file linking, custom help file creation, and program launching from help entries;
- Program settings menu (color schemes, working directories, keyboard and mouse modes, and many other options);
- HTML viewer with hyperlink navigation and automatic conversion between code pages (e.g., CP866, Windows-1251, KOI8-R).
