= Javelin Software =

Software extending the spreadsheet paradigm

Javelin Software Corporation
- Key people: Rob Firmin (CEO); Stan Kugell(President); Dick Bonzagni (Vice President of Marketing; Chris Herot (Vice President of Engineering)

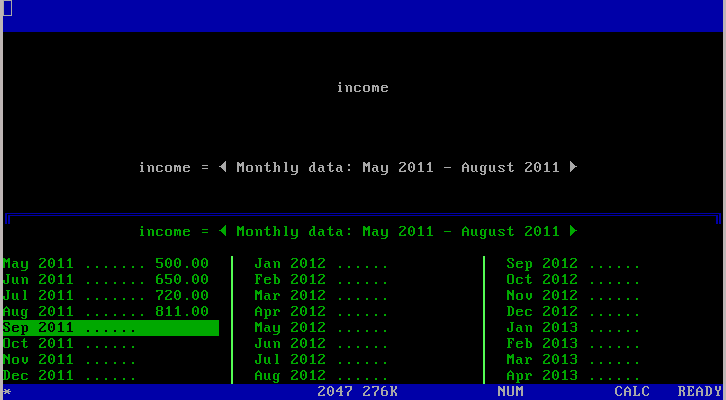
Screenshot: A variable with monthly period

Javelin Software Corporation (1984–1988) was a company in Cambridge, Massachusetts, USA, which developed an innovative modeling and data analysis product, also called Javelin (versions 1.0 in 1984 to 1.1), and later Javelin Plus (versions 1.0 in May 1987 to 3.5 in 1993). Seen as the successor technology to spreadsheet software in reviews of the time, and rival to the then-dominant Lotus 1-2-3, Javelin won numerous industry awards, including beating Microsoft's new Excel for the InfoWorld Software Product of the Year award.

Javelin Software fell on difficult times when its initial public offering had to be cancelled due to it being scheduled for only a few days after the stock market crash of 1987. The company's assets were later purchased by Information Resources, Incorporated (IRI), which sold enhancements to Javelin until 1994 when IRI was itself purchased by Oracle Corporation, which promptly discontinued the product.

Unlike models in a spreadsheet, Javelin models are built on objects called variables, not on data in cells of a report. For example, a time series, or any variable, is an object in itself, not a collection of cells which happen to appear in a row or column. Variables have many attributes, including complete awareness of their connections to all other variables, data references, and text and image notes. Calculations are performed on these objects, as opposed to a range of cells, so adding two time series automatically aligns them in calendar time, or in a user-defined time frame.

Data are independent of worksheets—variables, and therefore data, cannot be destroyed by deleting a row, column or entire worksheet. For instance, January's costs are subtracted from January's revenues, regardless of where or whether either appears in a worksheet. This permits actions later used in pivot tables, except that flexible manipulation of report tables is but one of many capabilities supported by variables. Moreover, if costs are entered by week and revenues by month, Javelin can allocate or interpolate as appropriate. This object design enabled variables and whole models to reference each other with user-defined variable names, and to perform multidimensional analysis and massive, but easily editable consolidations.

Javelin encourages viewing data and algorithms in various self-documenting ways, including simultaneous multiple synchronized views. For example, users can move through the connections between variables on a diagram while seeing the logical roots and branches of each variable. This is an example of what is perhaps its primary contribution—the concept of traceability of a user's logic or model structure through its twelve views. Among its dynamically linked views were: diagram, formulas, table, chart, QuickGraph, worksheet, notes, errors, macro and graph. A complex model can be dissected and understood by others who had no role in its creation, and this remains unique even today.

The second fundamental advance in Javelin's design is extensive built-in time series modeling, including calendar intelligence.

Javelin was used primarily for corporate and governmental financial modeling, but was also used to build instructional models in college chemistry courses, to model the world's economies, and by the military early in the "Star Wars" project. It is still in use by institutions for which model integrity is mission critical.

Javelin received multiple awards, including "Best of 1985" for technical excellence from PC Magazine, "Most Significant Product" from PC Week and "Software Product of the Year".

The InfoWorld award apparently created some consternation in the top ranks of number two Microsoft:

Then there was the year Microsoft's new Windows spreadsheet, Excel, was up against start-up Javelin Software's Javelin spreadsheet for InfoWorld Product of the Year. Although Excel was a beautiful extension of the existing spreadsheet concept, Javelin had imaginative features, says Michael McCarthy, InfoWorld reviews editor from 1984 to 1990 and current publisher of IDG's San Francisco-based Web Publishing Inc., producers of JavaWorld and SunWorld. "I persuaded InfoWorld to give Javelin Product of the Year," McCarthy says. "At the InfoWorld dinner at Comdex, when they gave out the award for Product of the Year and Excel came in second, Bill Gates got up and stomped out of the room in front of everybody in a spectacularly rude manner."

— "Backstage: InfoWorld's movers and shakers" by Scott Mace

Javelin was conceived by co-founder Rob Firmin, chairman and CEO, whose University of Chicago doctorate research and subsequent financial planning work at Prime Computer led him to creation of the concepts. His co-founder, Stan Kugell, president, worked with Firmin on the user interface. The Javelin development team was led by Christopher Herot, vice president of engineering, and included Charles Frankston, brother of the spreadsheet co-inventor Bob Frankston, Arye Gittelman, John R. Levine, Louise Cousins (Pathe) and Peter Pathe.

Some parts of Javelin's approach were later used by other products such as Lotus's Improv. Lotus essentially copied two Javelin features (named data arrays and pivot tables) onto a NeXTSTEP-based and later Windows-based GUI to create Improv. Since Improv was not based on 1980s MS-DOS technology, it suffered less memory-based limitations than Javelin, though Javelin performed well with DOS extended and expanded memory.

While its business failure has been attributed to the infancy of business GUI software at the time, as well as an ill-conceived marketing plan that placed it head to head with the popular spreadsheet 1-2-3, enterprise-wide financial models converted into Javelin models at times strained the PC resources of the day. Despite this, it remained a standard for financial modeling and econometrics for several years after it was discontinued by Oracle. For example, the World Bank modeled the world's economies in Javelin and distributed them in Javelin format for a number of years.
