= ODN =

ODN may refer to:

- Optical Distribution Network, the physical fibre and optical devices that distribute signals to users in a telecommunications network.
- Ordnance Datum Newlyn, the mean sea-level height datum in Great Britain.
- CpG Oligodeoxynucleotide also known as a CpG ODN, a molecule with immunostimulatory properties.
- Open DOS Navigator, an orthodox file manager for DOS
- Orbital Data Network, a public safety satellite network.
