= Dired =

File system directory editor

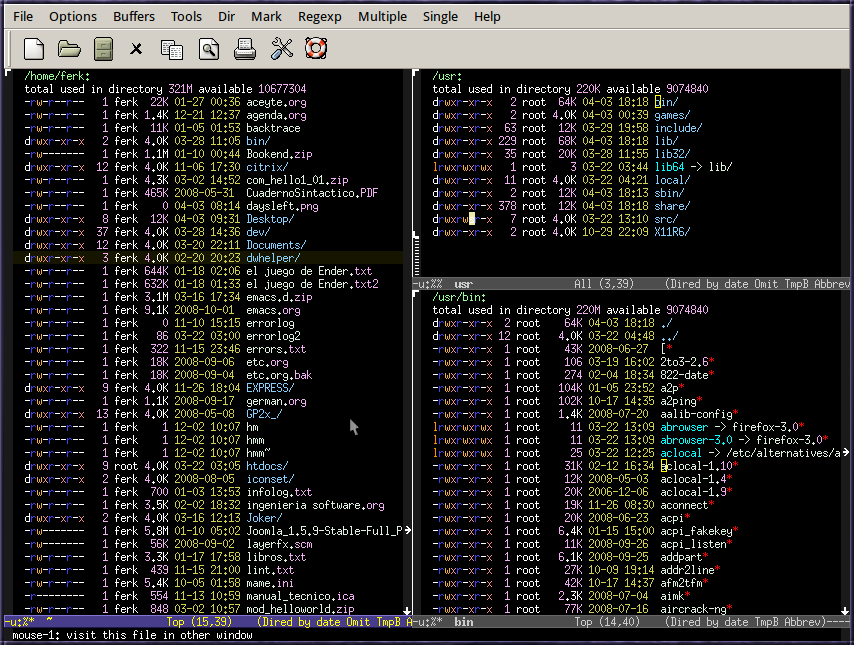
- Dired as implemented in Emacs, showing multiple buffers with custom colors.
- Developers: Stan Kugell (original), Richard Stallman (for Emacs), Mike Lijewski, Stuart Cracraft (standalone Unix versions)
- Release: Circa 1974; 52 years ago
- Stable release: 7.17 / 30 July 2009; 17 years ago
- Operating system: Unix-like, Microsoft Windows, macOS, Emacs
- Type: File manager
- License: GPL (Free software)
- Website: Mike Sperber's dired page

Dired (for Directory Editor) is a computer program for editing file system directories. It typically runs inside the Emacs text editor as a specialized mode, though standalone versions have been written. Dired was one of the first file managers, or visual editors of file system information. The first version of Dired was written as a stand-alone program independently in 1972 by Dave Lebling at Project MAC, and circa 1974 by Stan Kugell at the Stanford Artificial Intelligence Laboratory (SAIL). It was incorporated into GNU Emacs from the earliest versions, and re-implemented in C and C++ on other operating systems.

When run in Emacs, dired displays an ls-like file listing in an Emacs buffer. The list can be navigated using standard navigation commands. Several Emacs Lisp scripts have been developed to extend Dired in Emacs. In combination with Tramp it is able to access remote file systems for editing files by means of SSH, FTP, telnet and many other protocols, as well as the capability of accessing local files as another user in the same session. There are also functions that make it possible to rename multiple files via Emacs search and replace capabilities or apply regular expressions for marking (selecting) multiple files. Once marked, files can be operated on in various ways from deleting, to renaming, to executing an external shell command or elisp function on them. By means of the Lisp package dired-x it is also possible to handle existing ls-like directory listings in a virtual Dired mode. These can also be saved again, often using the filename extension dired.
