= Turbo Vision =

Text user interface

- Developer: Borland
- Release: 1990; 36 years ago
- Written in: Pascal; C++
- Operating system: MS-DOS
- Platform: IBM PC compatible PC-98
- Type: Widget toolkit
- License: Public domain software
- Website: tvision.sf.net

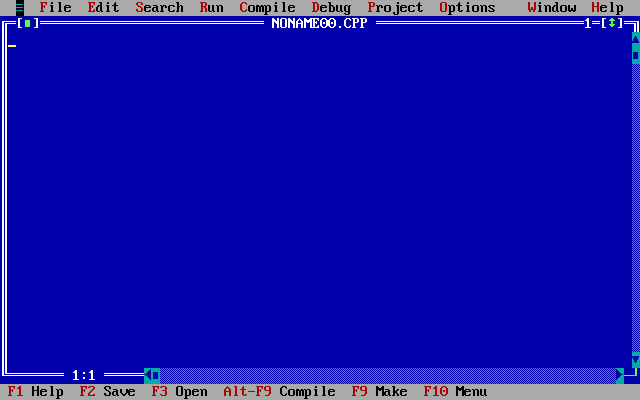
Turbo Vision based IDE for Turbo C++

Turbo Vision is a character-mode text user interface framework included with Borland Pascal, Turbo Pascal, and Borland C++ circa 1990. It was used by Borland itself to write the integrated development environments (IDE) for these programming languages. By default, Turbo Vision applications replicate the look and feel of these IDEs, including edit controls, list boxes, check boxes, radio buttons and menus, all of which have built-in mouse support. Later it was deprecated in favor of Object Windows Library, the Win16 API, and the GUI tools of Borland Delphi.

Around 1997, the C++ version, including source code, was released by Borland into the public domain. Several developers and developer teams have worked on their own versions of the framework afterwards. Some of them have been listed in the table below.

The Pascal version, which was distributed alongside Borland Pascal 7 on a "bonus" disk, was never released under a free software license, so the Free Pascal project recreated its own version by backporting a clone made by Leon de Boer that ran in graphical mode back to textmode. The result is called Free Vision. Over the years this codebase has grown stable on nearly all operating systems and architectures that FPC supports. The textmode IDE is very close to the original TP environment, with built-in compiler and IDE much closer than e.g. RHIDE, and supporting functionality like code folding.

== Unicode support ==
Turbo Vision was developed long before Unicode became popular. As of October 2020, there are Unicode versions for C++ and Free Pascal.

== Third-party implementations ==
Third-party Turbo Vision implementations
Project name	Active	Latest release	Last update	Unicode support	Language	Graphical	Platforms	License
Turbo Vision (magiblot)	Yes	No stable releases (according to GitHub)	As of May 2025, project is active	Yes (UTF-8)	C++	No	DOS, Linux, Windows	MIT
Turbo Vision (unxed), neurotranspiled from magiblot's C++ version	Yes	Not specified	October 2026	Yes (UTF-8)	Pascal	No	DOS, Linux, Windows	MIT
Turbo Vision 3 (unxed), unxed's version above switched from objects to classes	Yes	Not specified	October 2026	Yes (UTF-8)	Pascal	No	DOS, Linux, Windows	MIT
Free Vision	Yes	FPC 3.2.2	As of February 2025, project is active	Yes (since February 2022)	Pascal	No	Most platforms supported by FPC (tested on Linux and Windows)	LGPL with linking exception
TVision port to the GNU compiler	No	2.0.3	17 November 2016	No	C++	No	DOS, FreeBSD, Linux, QNX, Solaris and Win32	GPL
Port for Virtual Pascal	No	2.1 Build 279	13 May 2004	No information	Pascal	No	Windows, OS/2, Linux	No information
GraphVision	No	2.01	23 April 2001 (file date)	No information	Pascal	Yes	DOS (graphics mode)	No information
TVision (Sergio Sigala)	No	0.8	10 August 2001	No	C++	No	Linux and FreeBSD	BSD-like
Port for TMT Pascal	No	Not specified	18 August 2000 (file date)	No information	Pascal	No	DOS (TMT Pascal)	No information
Graphics Vision (MKM Software)	No	3.0 (DOS/DPMI/Windows), 2.10R2, 2.01 (DOS)	9 February 1999 (version 3.0)	No information	Pascal	Yes	DOS, Windows, Linux (GV/FPC), DPMI	Free for individual use, commercial license, DOS libraries - LGPL
Super Vision	No	2.2	Unknown	No information	Pascal	Yes	DOS (SVGA)	No information
Turbo Vision for Rust	Yes	1.0.0	18 November 2025	Yes	Rust	No	MacOS, Windows, Linux	MIT
vtui, Turbo Vision-inspired TUI framework with API close to TV	Yes	Not specified	October 2026	Yes (UTF-8)	Go	No	MacOS, Windows, Linux, BSD, Solaris and more	BSD 3-clause

== Applications using Turbo Vision ==
- Dos Navigator
- IBM Handshaker
- SET Edtor
- RHIDE
- OSPlus Text editor
- TMBasic
- NE (NO EDLIN)
- EditV
- IDA (DOS version)
- turbo (text editor)
- tvterm (terminal emulator)

== See also ==
- Box-drawing characters
