= Integration tree =

Graph visualising software GUI components

An integration tree (or GUI tree) is a graph that visualises all the GUI components of a software. Each node of the tree show the GUI components used in this software. The components on the leaves of the tree are modeless GUI elements, those on the nodes are modal GUI elements. GUIs are highly involved entities.
