= Stan Kugell =

American computer scientist

- Education: Harvard Law School Harvard University Kennedy School of Government Stanford University Massachusetts Institute of Technology
- Occupations: Investor, Inventor, Entrepreneur, Syndicated Radio Host
- Organization(s): MIT Artificial Intelligence Lab, Stanford Artificial Intelligence Lab, Xerox PARC
- Notable work: Dired, Javelin Software, Telephone and Geolocation Patents
- Board member of: Chairman Alfama, Inc., Chairman Fairfield Computer Corporation, Former Chairman A-FAX, Former Chairman All-Desk, Former Board of Overseers Boston Baroque, Former Director Buckminster Corporation, Former Director FaxNet, Former Director Javelin Software, Former Director Office One, Former Chairman Wizi
- Awards: PC Magazine Technical Excellence InfoWorld Software Product of the Year

Stan Kugell is an American investor, entrepreneur, inventor, and computer scientist. He is current or former director of over a dozen corporate and non-profit boards. He remains active advising technology entrepreneurs privately and as a Mentor at the Harvard i-Lab. He was a research scientist at the Stanford Artificial Intelligence Lab, where he invented Dired. At the Xerox Palo Alto Research Center he and Ed McCreight built the first voicemail system. He co-founded Javelin Software and was primary designer of its user interface. He is inventor or co-inventor of seven U.S. and international patents and applications. He co-hosted Kugell & McLaughlin, a nationally syndicated political talk radio program, and served as a commentator on the public radio show Marketplace and on the Pacifica Radio Network.
