= File System Visualizer =

File manager for Linux and other Unix-like operating systems

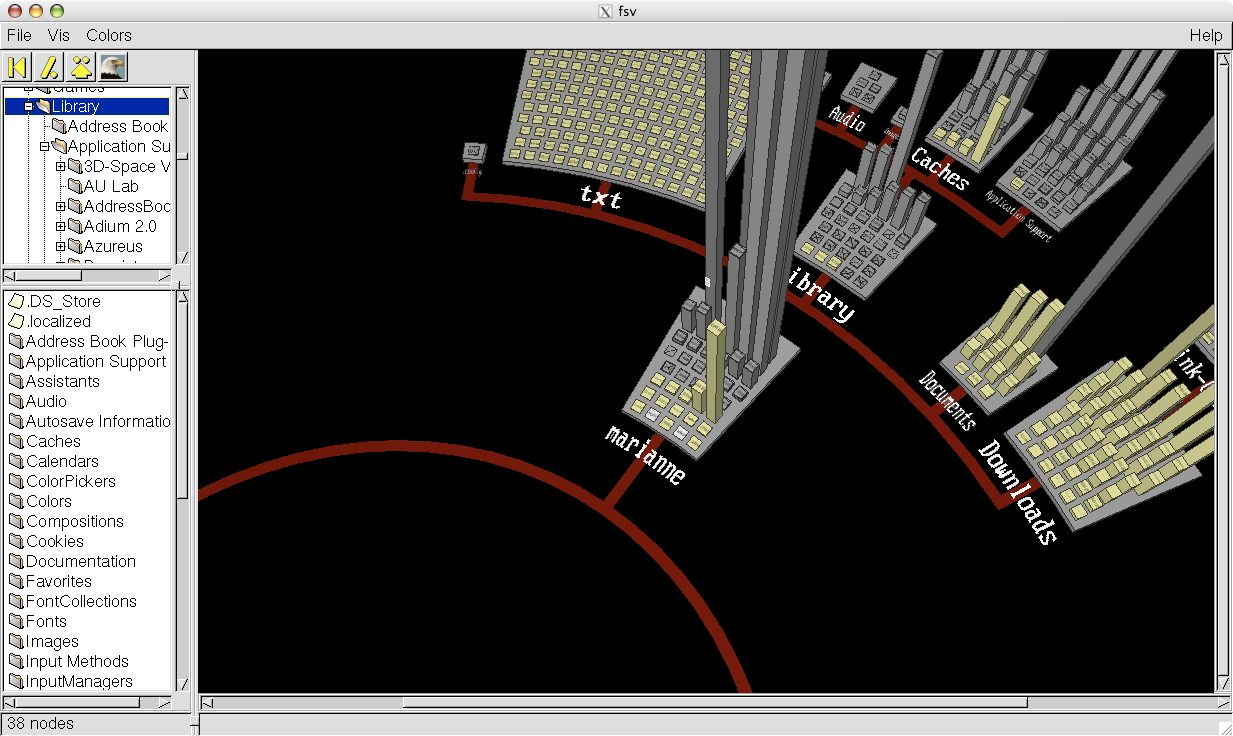
- File System Visualizer showing a user's home directory on Mac OS X
- Developer: Daniel Richard G.
- Stable release: 0.9 / September 8, 1999; 27 years ago
- Written in: C
- Operating system: Unix-like
- Available in: English
- Type: File manager
- License: GNU Lesser General Public License
- Website: fsv.sourceforge.net

File System Visualizer, also known as fsv, is a 3D file browser using OpenGL, written by Daniel Richard G. It is a clone of SGI's fsn file manager for IRIX systems, aimed to run on modern Linux and other Unix-like operating systems. While not officially deprecated, the source code for the software has not been modified since 2001.

It is capable of representing file systems in two ways:

- MapV mode: files and directories are represented as cuboids of equal height, with the size of the cuboid representing the size of the file or directory.
- TreeV mode: files and directories are shown in a more conventional file tree style, with links between parent directories and subdirectories, and columns of various height (indicating file size) on top of the directories to represent the files inside.

In both of these modes, a standard 2D file tree is displayed on the left of the window. The mouse can be used to rotate the 3D representation of the file system, and an "Eagle Eye" function shows the representation from an overhead view. File System Visualizer is also capable of manipulating the files and directories it displays.

== In popular culture ==
The 1993 film Jurassic Park has a scene that prominently features SGI's fsn, the original version of the utility that fsv clones.
