= Console user interface =

Console user interface may refer to:

- Command-line interface, user interface using only text
- Text-based user interface, user interface with simple text-based menus and dialogues
