= DOS Navigator =

File manager for DOS, OS/2 and Windows

- Screenshot of DOS Navigator
- Original authors: Stefan Tanurkov, Andrew Zabolotny, Sergey Melnik (initial release)
- Developer: Ritlabs
- Release: 1991; 35 years ago
- Stable release: 1.51 / 19 April 1999
- Written in: Turbo Pascal, Turbo Vision
- Operating system: DOS, OS/2, Windows
- Type: Orthodox file manager
- License: BSD-3-Clause
- Website: ritlabs.com/en/products/dn/

DOS Navigator (DN) is an orthodox file manager for DOS, OS/2, and Windows.

== Influence ==
DOS Navigator is an influential early implementation of orthodox file manager (OFM). By implementing three additional types of virtual file systems (VFS): XTree, Briefcase and list-based, DN launched a new generation of OFMs. It offers unlimited panels and many new important features, making it one of the most powerful (and complex) OFMs.

== History ==
The initial version of DN I (v 0.90) was released in 1991, and written by Stefan Tanurkov, Andrew Zabolotny and Sergey Melnik (all from Chișinău, Moldova). After that, DN was rewritten using Turbo Vision by Stefan Tanurkov and Dmitry Dotsenko (Dotsenko developed DN at Moscow State University). These versions are sometimes referred as DN II.

In 1993, Slava Filimonov invited Stefan to join him to continue producing and publishing DN with joint efforts. Slava programmed new components, design and made countless optimizations and improvements. He wrote a new software key protection system that remained unbroken for almost four years after its introduction.

DN II was actively developed until the start of 1995, until version 1.35. Several other programmers participated in development after version 1.35. Starting from version 1.37, Filimonov and Ilya Bagdasarov were in charge of bug-fixing. Filimonov and Bagdasarov solely maintained, developed and released versions 1.37 through 1.39. After they left, DN was maintained again by Tanurkov and Maxim Masiutin.

In 1998, the development mostly took a bug-fixing direction as Ritlabs' product The Bat! became a more promising software product with much better commercial potential. The last shareware version was 1.50. In late 1999, Ritlabs decided to make version 1.51 of the DOS Navigator completely free with freely available source code.

Several open source DN branches currently exist including win32/dpmi/os2 version "dn/2" and Linux port attempt "dn2l".

== Disadvantages ==
The original DN contains a large amount of assembler code, complicating ports to other platforms. The cross-platform version, DN OSP, in turn, is tied to the Virtual Pascal compiler and runtime library, which are no longer supported. No version of DN as of January 2022 supports Unicode on platforms other than Windows, although cross-platform implementation of Turbo Vision for Pascal with Unicode support exists. The source code license is compromised.

=== Source code license ===
DN source code was published under the 3-clause BSD license. However, the code included an implementation of the Turbo Vision library based on the version from the Turbo Pascal distribution, and the latter was never released under a license that allows creation of derivative works. In addition, DN OSP contains modified parts of the Virtual Pascal runtime library, while the license for Virtual Pascal itself prohibits distribution of modified versions, however, it is not clear whether this applies only to the compiler or to the runtime library too.

== Legacy ==
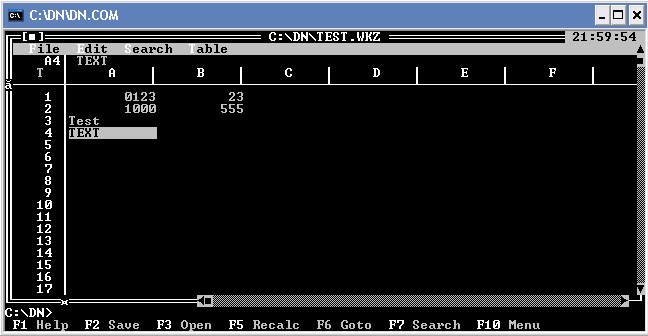
Spreadsheet in DOS Navigator

Other groups release software based on the DN open source code, including features such as support for long filenames, and support for Linux.

- DN 1.51 650 KB for Win32 & OS/2 - Sources (Virtual Pascal) (972,655)
- DOS Navigator Open Source Project (ODN)
- dn2l Linux port based on DN OSP source code
- DN OSP 6.4.0 1 MB for DOS/DPMI (Windows 9x)
- Necromancer's DOS Navigator (NDN)
- DN 4.9.0 2004 for DOS included in Ultimate Boot CD (UBCD) v3.4

== See also ==
- Orthodox file manager
- Comparison of file managers
