= Paeth =

Paeth may refer to:

- Paeth filter, a filtering algorithm used in the compression of PNG images
- Alan W. Paeth (born 1956), Canadian/American computer scientist who developed the Paeth filter
- Sascha Paeth (born 1970), German musician
