= JNG =

JNG may refer to:

- JPEG Network Graphics
- JNG-90, sniper rifle
- Jets'n'Guns, a video game
- ISO 639 code for the Wardaman language
- IATA code for Jining Da'an Airport
- Station code for Jatinegara railway station
- John Nance Garner (1868–1967), 32nd vice president of the United States
