= GIFBuilder =

Free GIF image editing software

- Developer: Yves Piguet
- Release: 1996; 30 years ago
- Written in: C (programming language)
- Middleware: Carbon

GIFBuilder was an early animated GIF creation program for Apple Macintosh computers. It was written by Yves Piguet and released as freeware. It is one of the few freeware applications to support the GIF format.

GIFBuilder was released in 1996 and that year won the Ziff Davis Shareware Award in the Graphics and Multimedia category. GIFBuilder was developed from clip2gif, an earlier program by the same author, which was an Apple Event-based CGI script for generating GIF images on WebSTAR and other Macintosh web servers of the era.

It was ported to Mac OS X using the Carbon (API) library, but has not been updated to function with OS X version after Lion.

== See also ==
- Microsoft GIF Animator
