= Ken Silverman =

American programmer (born 1975)

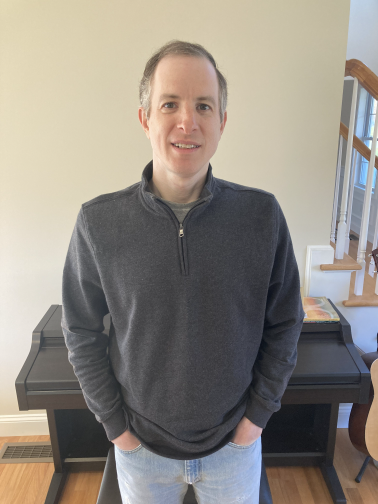
- Silverman in 2021
- Born: November 1, 1975 (age 51); Mount Kisco, New York, U.S.
- Education: Brown University (BSc)
- Occupation: Game programmer
- Years active: 1989-present
- Known for: Build engine, Ken's Labyrinth, Voxlap
- Website: advsys.net/ken/

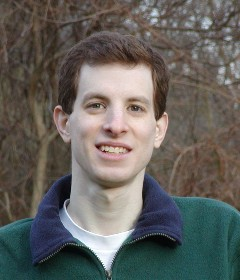
Silverman in 2002

Ken Silverman (born November 1, 1975) is an American former game programmer, best known for writing the Build engine. It was most notably utilized by Duke Nukem 3D, Shadow Warrior, Blood, and more than a dozen other games in the mid- to late-1990s.

Once considered the primary rival of John Carmack (later succeeded by Tim Sweeney), Silverman started work on the Build engine sometime before his first semester at Brown University in 1993, under a contract with Apogee Software. In the wake of Duke Nukem 3D and other Build engine games, Silverman left the commercial game industry.

Silverman has been CTO and co-founder of Ardfry Imaging, LLC responsible for the PNG Compression tool PNGOUT. He is the founder and Chief Computer Scientist of VOXON, makers of a 3D volumetric display system.

== Projects ==
=== Ken's Labyrinth ===
Ken's Labyrinth is a first-person shooter video game coded by Silverman. It was originally released in 1993 as shareware by Epic MegaGames. The source code to the project and even older versions can now be found on Silverman's website.

=== Build engine ===
The Build engine is a first-person shooter engine created by Ken Silverman for 3D Realms from 1993 to 1996. The engine was used in a number of popular games of the era, and its source code was released on June 20, 2000. Shortly after the Duke Nukem 3D source code was released in 2003, Silverman added the Polymost renderer to the Build engine. From 2006 to 2011 he prototyped a successor to the engine, titled Build2. He released his drafts for the engine on March 7, 2018.

=== Voxlap ===
In 2000, Silverman started work on Voxlap, a voxel-driven graphics engine. In addition to the engine, a Voxlap-powered tech demo was produced in cooperation with Tom Dobrowolski. Since 2003, development on the engine has been fairly static, the source code to the engine was released by Silverman in 2005, allowing commercial derivatives with permission. Ace of Spades, a 2011 online multiplayer shooter, was developed from the Voxlap engine.

=== Other projects ===
Other creations by Silverman include the ZIP file archiver KZIP, the EVALDRAW programming environment, and the PNG file-size optimizer PNGOUT. In 2006, a GUI-driven version of PNGOUT known as PNGOUTWin was released by Ardfry Imaging, a small company Silverman co-founded in 2005.

=== Voxon Photonics ===
In early 2013, Silverman joined Voxon Photonics as Chief Computer Scientist. His role is primarily that of programming the volumetric graphics engine for the Voxiebox, a swept surface volumetric display being described by Voxon as "the world's first holographic arcade game system". The Voxiebox is capable of generating points of light within a volume of space, and in doing so enables the creation of 3D multiplayer gaming experiences that can be viewed from any angle without special glasses.
