= PNGOUT =

Command-line PNG optimiser

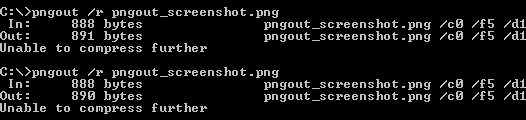
- Two runs of PNGOUT with randomization in Microsoft Windows
- Original author: Ken Silverman
- Developer: Ken Silverman
- Initial release: January 15, 2002; 23 years ago
- Stable release: February 13, 2015; 10 years ago
- Operating system: Microsoft Windows
- Type: Image optimizer
- License: Freeware
- Website: advsys.net/ken/utils.htm

PNGOUT is a freeware command line optimizer for PNG images written by Ken Silverman. The transformation is lossless, meaning that the resulting image is visually identical to the source image. According to its author, this program can often get higher compression than other optimizers by 5–10%. It is possible to compress some inflated PNGs to a size below 1% of the original file.

PNGOUT was also available as a plug-in for the freeware image viewer IrfanView and can be enabled as an option when saving files. It allows editing of various PNGOUT settings via a dialog box. PNGOUT integration was removed in IrfanView version 4.58 in favour of OptiPNG.

In 2006, a commercial version of PNGOUT with a graphical user interface, known as PNGOUTWin, was released by Ardfry Imaging, a small company Silverman co-founded in 2005. There is also a freeware GUI frontend to PNGOUT available, known as PNGGauntlet.

== Main operation ==
The main function of PNGOUT is to reduce the size of image data contained in the IDAT chunk. This chunk is compressed using the deflate algorithm. Deflate algorithms can vary in speed and compression ratio, with higher compression ratios generally implying lower speed. Ken Silverman wrote a deflate compressor for PNGOUT that is slower than the ones used in most graphics software, but produces smaller files. PNGOUT also performs automatic bit depth, color, and palette reduction where appropriate.

== See also ==
- pngcrush
- ZopfliPNG
