= Tom Lane (computer scientist) =

American computer scientist

- Born: Thomas G. Lane; September 18, 1955 (age 71); Madrid, Spain
- Education: Carnegie Mellon University (Ph.D., 1990)
- Known for: Independent JPEG Group; PostgreSQL; Portable Network Graphics (PNG)
- Scientific career
- Fields: Computer science

Thomas G. Lane is a computer scientist dedicated to open-source software. In a 2000 survey, he was listed as one of the top 10 contributors to an intended-to-be-representative sample of open-source software, having contributed 0.782% of the total code.

Lane's contributions to open-source include:

- Organizer of the Independent JPEG Group (IJG);
- Member of the core steering committee of PostgreSQL;
- Co-author of the Portable Network Graphics (PNG) specification;
- Member of the Tagged Image File Format (TIFF) advisory committee;
- Contributor to the Ptolemy Project.

== Biography ==
Lane holds a Doctor of Philosophy (Ph.D.) in computer science from Carnegie Mellon University, awarded in 1990. He occasionally lectures there, and at other places. He has worked for Hewlett-Packard, Structured Software Systems, Great Bridge, Red Hat, Salesforce, Crunchy Data, and Snowflake Inc..

While at Structured Software Lane starting looking for an open source database that would serve his needs and choose PostgreSQL from the other open source candidates available at the time. In July 2000, Lane was employed by Great Bridge, one of the first PostgreSQL support companies. However, the firm was dissolved in September 2001 and he moved to Red Hat, a competitor of Great Bridge at the time, to develop their version of PostgreSQL named Red Hat Database. The Red Hat Database project was later cancelled, but Lane continued to work there to develop PostgreSQL. Between May 2013 and October 2015, he worked at Salesforce.com. In 2015, Lane began working for Crunchy Data to allow more time to support the PostgreSQL community. In 2025 Snowflake acquired Crunchy Data to bring enterprise ready Postgres to their AI Data Cloud. Lane is part of the PostgreSQL core team.

== PostgreSQL ==
Lane is a member of the core PostgreSQL development team. He is:

Involved in all aspects of PostgreSQL, including bug evaluation and fixes, performance improvements, and major new features, such as schemas. He is also responsible for the optimizer.

== Image formats ==
=== Independent JPEG Group ===
The Independent JPEG Group (IJG) is an informal group that writes and distributes a widely used free library for JPEG image compression. The IJG is arguably one of the important early open source groups and a major reason why the JPEG image format is a standard.

Probably the largest and most important contribution however was the work of the Independent JPEG Group (IJG), and Tom Lane in particular. Their Open Source software implementation, as well as being one of the major Open Source packages was key to the success of the JPEG standard and was incorporated by many companies into a variety of products such as image editors and web browsers.

The IJG develops and maintains libjpeg, a library written entirely in C which contains a widely used implementation of a JPEG decoder, JPEG encoder and other JPEG utilities.

=== PNG ===
The original specification for the Portable Network Graphics (PNG), version 1.0, was written by Thomas Boutell and Lane, with contributions by many others.

Lane is a contributing editor for PNG Specification, version 1.1.

=== TIFF ===
Lane is a member of the Tagged Image File Format (TIFF) advisory committee.

== Humor ==
- In disputing a JPEG patent claim: "The patent describes a three-way symbol classification; the closest analog in JPEG is a two-way classification. If the jury can count higher than two, the case will fail."
- In describing the attention to detail of another software company: "The Single Unix Spec says that getopt() is supposed to be defined by <unistd.h>, but I guess reading the spec closely is not a hobby in Redmond..."
- In contributing to: "The Only Coke Machine on the Internet" "Since time immemorial (well, maybe 1970) the Carnegie-Mellon CS department has maintained a departmental Coke machine which sells bottles of Coke for a dime or so less than other vending machines around campus. As no Real Programmer can function without caffeine, the machine is very popular..."
- On idiotic benchmark comparisons: "Try to carry 500 people from Los Angeles to Tokyo in an F-15. No? Try to win a dogfight in a 747. No? But they both fly, so it must be useful to compare them ... especially on the basis of the most simplistic test case you can think of. For extra points, use *only one* test case. Perhaps this paper can be described as "comparing an F-15 to a 747 on the basis of required runway length".

== In modern culture ==
- Mentioned in the Doom 3 video game readme file
- Partly responsible for JPEG being standardized as the dominant computer image format on the World Wide Web

== Works ==
- Thomas G. Lane, JPEG FAQ
- Thomas G. Lane, PostgreSQL Concurrency Issues
- Thomas G. Lane, User interface software structures
- Thomas G. Lane, Studying Software Architecture Through Design Spaces and Rules
