= Multiple-image Network Graphics =

File format

- Filename extension: .mng
- Internet media type: video/x-mng (unofficial)
- Developed by: PNG Development Group (donated to W3C)
- Type of format: computer animation
- Container for: PNG, JNG
- Extended from: PNG

Multiple-image Network Graphics (MNG) is a graphics file format published in 2001 for animated images. Its specification is publicly documented and there are free software reference implementations available.

MNG is closely related to the PNG image format. When PNG development started in early 1995, developers decided not to incorporate support for animation, because the majority of the PNG developers felt that overloading a single file type with both still and animation features is a bad design, both for users (who have no simple way of determining to which class a given image file belongs) and for web servers (which should use a MIME type starting with image/ for stills and video/ for animations—GIF notwithstanding), but work soon started on MNG as an animation-supporting version of PNG. Version 1.0 of the MNG specification was released on 31 January 2001.

== File support ==
=== Support ===
Gwenview has native MNG support. GIMP can export images as MNG files. Imagemagick can create a MNG file from a series of PNG files. With the MNG plugin, Irfanview can read a MNG file. If MPlayer is linked against libmng, it and all its graphical front-ends like Gnome MPlayer can display MNG files.

Mozilla browsers and Netscape 6.0, 6.01 and 7.0 included native support for MNG until the code was removed in 2003 due to code size and little actual usage, causing complaints on the Mozilla development site. Mozilla later added support for APNG as a simpler alternative. Similarly, early versions of the Konqueror browser included MNG support but it was later dropped. MNG support was never included in Google Chrome, Internet Explorer, Opera, or Safari.

Product		Support status
Image processing
Image processing	Chasys Draw IES	Yes
Image processing	GIMP	Partial
Image processing	Gwenview	Yes
Image processing	ImageMagick	Yes
Image processing	Irfanview	Partial, via plugin
Image processing	KMPlayer	Yes
Image processing	Konvertor	Yes
Image processing	MPlayer	Yes
Image processing	XnView	Yes

=== Server support ===
Web servers are generally not pre-configured to support MNG files.

The MNG developers had hoped that MNG would replace GIF for animated images on the World Wide Web, just as PNG had done for still images. However, with the expiration of LZW patents and existence of other alternative file formats such as APNG, Flash, and SVG, web usage of MNG was far less than its developers had expected.

== Technical details ==
The structure of MNG files is essentially the same as that of PNG files, differing only in the slightly different signature (8A 4D 4E 47 0D 0A 1A 0A in hexadecimal, where 4D 4E 47 is ASCII for "MNG" – see Portable Network Graphics: File header) and the use of a much greater variety of chunks to support all the animation features that it provides. Images to be used in the animation are stored in the MNG file as encapsulated PNG or JNG images.

To allow applications to include some level of MNG support without having to implement the entire MNG specification, two reduced-complexity versions of MNG are also defined: MNG-LC (low complexity) and MNG-VLC (very low complexity). These reduced specifications are conceptually similar to the "SVG Basic" and "SVG Tiny" subsets offered in the SVG standard.

MNG does not have a registered MIME media type, but video/x-mng or image/x-mng can be used. MNG animations may be included in HTML pages using the <embed> or <object> tag.

Saving a file as MNG can be either lossy or lossless, depending on whether its frames are encoded in PNG (lossless) or JNG (lossy).

== Alternatives ==
Most modern web browsers support animations in APNG, SVG, WebP, and WebM. As of February 2024 only Apple Safari supports HEIF and JPEG XL. Internet Explorer only supported GIF, CSS, and Flash animations.

The most common alternatives to MNG have been Animated GIF and – until it was deprecated in 2017 – Adobe Flash. GIF images are restricted to 256 colors with limited compression, but the format is supported in all graphical web browsers and is still widely used.

Animations can also be generated ad hoc in a browser with the CSS 3 features animations, transitions, and sprites, or with the web animations API of JavaScript, by specifying frames or motions of still images or rendered shapes. Ad-hoc animations can be resource-intensive, and they generally cannot be saved in a portable file or posted on imageboards.

== See also ==
- Animated Portable Network Graphics (APNG)
- JPEG Network Graphics (JNG)
