= Alan W. Paeth =

Canadian computer scientist and author (1956–2018)

Alan William Paeth (/peɪθ/ PAYTH; 11 May 1956 – 3 June 2018) was a Canadian computer scientist and author.

== Life and education ==
Alan William Paeth was born on May 11, 1956, in Seattle, Washington. He obtained a bachelor's degree in computer science from Caltech and his PhD at the University of Waterloo in 1994. His undergraduate advisor was Carver Mead. His doctoral advisor was William B. Cowan and his doctoral dissertation was on Linear Models of Reflective Colour. He married Catherine Anne Person in 1983; she predeceased him in 2008.

He died in Kelowna, British Columbia, on June 3, 2018.

== Career ==
He was professor of computer science at Okanagan University College in British Columbia.

As a PhD student he made major research contributions to computer graphics, including algorithms for shear mapping and pre–image compression filtering; the Paeth filter implemented in the Portable Network Graphics (PNG) image format was derived from his work.

Prior to starting graduate school, he worked at Xerox PARC, where he was a member of the group headed by Lynn Conway (who initiated the VLSI chip design revolution with Paeth's former Caltech advisor Carver Mead).

== Selected publications ==
His notable books include:

- Graphics Gems V
- Algorithms for fast color correction
- The IM raster toolkit : design, implementation and use
- Linear models of reflective colour
