= Microsoft GIF Animator =

Historical computer software

- Microsoft GIF Animator in Windows 7
- Developer: Microsoft
- Release: 1996; 30 years ago
- Final release: 1.0.0.101
- Operating system: Windows 95, Windows NT 4.0
- Size: 523 Kb
- Available in: English
- Type: Animation software
- License: Freeware

Microsoft GIF Animator is a historical computer software program for Microsoft Windows to create simple animated GIF files based on the GIF89a file format. It was freely downloadable from the Microsoft Download Center but is now only available through MSDN and on third-party download sites. It was also bundled with Microsoft Image Composer and Microsoft FrontPage.

Animations can be looped, spun, and faded in and out; users can set the size and transparency of images. Automatic and custom palette creation are supported.

== See also ==
- Microsoft Paint
