= FELICS =

Image compression algorithm

FELICS, which stands for Fast Efficient & Lossless Image Compression System, is a lossless image compression algorithm that performs 5-times faster than the original lossless JPEG codec and achieves a similar compression ratio.

== History ==
It was invented by Paul G. Howard and Jeffrey S. Vitter of the Department of Computer Science at Brown University in Providence, Rhode Island, USA, and was first presented at the 1993 IEEE Data Compression Conference in Snowbird, Utah. It was successfully implemented in hardware and deployed as part of HiRISE on the Mars Reconnaissance Orbiter.

== Principle ==
Pixel prediction neighborhoods.

Like other lossless codecs for continuous-tone images, FELICS operates by decorrelating the image and encoding it with an entropy coder. The decorrelation is the context $\Delta = H - L$ where $H=max(P1,P2)$ and $L=min(P1,P2)$ where $P1,P2$ are the pixel's two nearest neighbors (causal, already coded and known at the decoder) used for providing the context to code the present pixel $P$. Except at the top and left edges, these are the pixel above and the pixel to the left. For example, the neighbors of pixel X in the diagram are A and B, but if X were at the left side, its neighbors would be B and D.

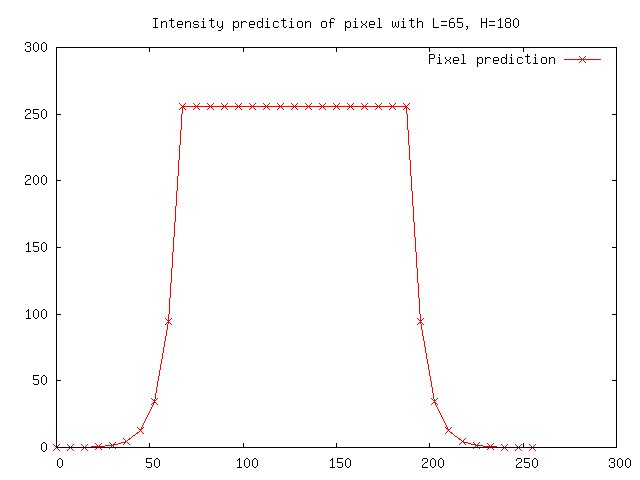
P lies within the closed interval [L, H] roughly half the time. Otherwise, it is above H or below L. These can be encoded as 1, 01, and 00 respectively (p. 4). The following figure shows the (idealized) histogram of the pixels and their intensity values along the x-axis, and frequency of occurrence along the y-axis.

The distribution of P within the range [L, H] is nearly uniform with a minor peak near the center $(L+H)/2$ of this range. When P falls in the range [L, H], P − L is encoded using an adjusted binary code such that values in the center of the range use floor(log_{2}(Δ + 1)) bits and values at the ends use ceil (log_{2}(Δ + 1)) bits (p. 2). For example, when Δ = 11, the codes for P − L in 0 to 11 may be 0000, 0001, 0010, 0011, 010, 011, 100, 101, 1100, 1101, 1110, 1111.

Outside the range, P tends to follow a geometric distribution on each side (p. 3). It is encoded using a Rice code with parameters chosen based on previous choices. For each Δ and each possible Rice code parameter k, the algorithm keeps track of the total number of bits that would have been used to encode pixels outside the range. Then for each pixel, it chooses the Rice code with the based on Δ at the pixel.

== Improvements ==
FELICS improvements include methods for estimating Δ and estimating k. For instance, Howard and Vitter's article recognizes that relatively flat areas (with small Δ, especially where L = H) may have some noise, and compression performance in these areas improves by widening the interval, increasing the effective Δ. It is also possible to estimate the optimal k for a given Δ based on the mean of all prediction residues seen so far, which is faster and uses less memory than computing the number of bits used for each k.

== See also ==
- JPEG-LS
- PNG
- Exif - Exchangeable image file format
- GIMP
- Image compression
- Image file formats
- Comparison of graphics file formats
