= JPEG =

Lossy compression method for reducing the size of digital images

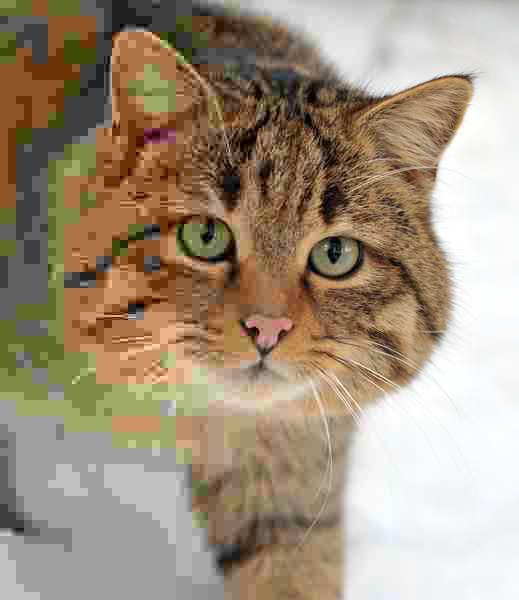
- A photo of a European wildcat with the compression rate, and associated losses, decreasing from left to right
- Filename extension: .jpg, .jpeg, .jpe.jif, .jfif, .jfi
- Internet media type: image/jpeg
- Type code: JPEG
- Uniform Type Identifier (UTI): public.jpeg
- Magic number: ff d8 ff
- Developed by: Joint Photographic Experts Group, IBM, Mitsubishi Electric, AT&T, Canon Inc.
- Initial release: 18 September 1992; 34 years ago
- Type of format: Lossy image compression format
- Compression: Id
- Extended to: JPEG 2000
- Standard: ISO/IEC 10918, ITU-T T.81, ITU-T T.83, ITU-T T.84, ITU-T T.86
- Website: jpeg.org/jpeg/

Continuously varied JPEG compression (between Q=100 and Q=1) for an abdominal CT scan

JPEG (/ˈdʒeɪpɛɡ/ JAY-peg, short for Joint Photographic Experts Group and sometimes retroactively referred to as JPEG 1) is a commonly used method of lossy compression for digital images, particularly for those images produced by digital photography. The degree of compression can be adjusted, allowing a selectable trade off between storage size and image quality. JPEG typically achieves 10:1 compression with a loss in image quality that, while perceptible, is widely agreed upon to be acceptable. Since its introduction in 1992, JPEG has been the most widely used image compression standard in the world, and the most widely used digital image format, with several billion JPEG images produced every day as of 2015.

The Joint Photographic Experts Group created the standard in 1992, based on the discrete cosine transform (DCT) algorithm. JPEG compression is used in a number of image file formats. JPEG/Exif is the most common image format used by digital cameras and other photographic image capture devices; along with JPEG/JFIF, it is the most common format for storing and transmitting photographic images on the World Wide Web. These format variations are often not distinguished and are simply called JPEG.

The MIME media type for JPEG is "image/jpeg", except in older Internet Explorer versions, which provide a MIME type of "image/pjpeg" when uploading JPEG images. JPEG files usually have a filename extension of "jpg" or "jpeg". JPEG/JFIF supports a maximum image size of 65,535×65,535 pixels, hence up to 4 gigapixels for an aspect ratio of 1:1. In 2000, the JPEG group introduced a format intended to be a successor, JPEG 2000, but it was unable to replace the original JPEG as the dominant image standard.

== History ==
=== Background ===
The original JPEG specification published in 1992 implements processes from various earlier research papers and patents cited by the CCITT (now ITU-T) and Joint Photographic Experts Group.

The basis for JPEG's lossy compression algorithm is the discrete cosine transform (DCT), which was first proposed by Nasir Ahmed as an image compression technique in 1972. Ahmed published the DCT algorithm with T. Natarajan and K. R. Rao in a 1974 paper, which is cited in the JPEG specification.

The JPEG specification cites patents from several companies. The following patents provided the basis for its arithmetic coding algorithm.

- IBM
  - U.S. patent 4,652,856 – 4 February 1986 – Kottappuram M. A. Mohiuddin and Jorma J. Rissanen – Multiplication-free multi-alphabet arithmetic code
  - U.S. patent 4,905,297 – 27 February 1990 – G. Langdon, J. L. Mitchell, W. B. Pennebaker, and Jorma J. Rissanen – Arithmetic coding encoder and decoder system
  - U.S. patent 4,935,882 – 19 June 1990 – W. B. Pennebaker and J. L. Mitchell – Probability adaptation for arithmetic coders
- Mitsubishi Electric
  - JP H02202267 (1021672) – 21 January 1989 – Toshihiro Kimura, Shigenori Kino, Fumitaka Ono, Masayuki Yoshida – Coding system
  - JP H03247123 (2-46275) – 26 February 1990 – Tomohiro Kimura, Shigenori Kino, Fumitaka Ono, and Masayuki Yoshida – Coding apparatus and coding method

The JPEG specification also cites three other patents from IBM. Other companies cited as patent holders include AT&T (two patents) and Canon Inc. Absent from the list is U.S. patent 4,698,672, filed by Compression Labs' Wen-Hsiung Chen and Daniel J. Klenke in October 1986. The patent describes a DCT-based image compression algorithm, and would later be a cause of controversy in 2002 (see Patent controversy below). However, the JPEG specification did cite two earlier research papers by Wen-Hsiung Chen, published in 1977 and 1984.

=== JPEG standard ===
"JPEG" stands for Joint Photographic Experts Group, the name of the committee that created the JPEG standard and other still picture coding standards. The "Joint" stood for ISO TC97 WG8 and CCITT SGVIII. Founded in 1986, the group developed the JPEG standard during the late 1980s. The group published the JPEG standard in 1992.

In 1987, ISO TC 97 became ISO/IEC JTC 1 and, in 1992, CCITT became ITU-T. Currently on the JTC1 side, JPEG is one of two sub-groups of ISO/IEC Joint Technical Committee 1, Subcommittee 29, Working Group 1 (ISO/IEC JTC 1/SC 29/WG 1) – titled as Coding of still pictures. On the ITU-T side, ITU-T SG16 is the respective body. The original JPEG Group was organized in 1986, issuing the first JPEG standard in 1992, which was approved in September 1992 as ITU-T Recommendation T.81 and, in 1994, as ISO/IEC 10918-1.

The JPEG standard specifies the codec, which defines how an image is compressed into a stream of bytes and decompressed back into an image, but not the file format used to contain that stream. The Exif and JFIF standards define the commonly used file formats for interchange of JPEG-compressed images.

JPEG standards are formally named as Information technology – Digital compression and coding of continuous-tone still images. ISO/IEC 10918 consists of the following parts:

Digital compression and coding of continuous-tone still images – Parts
Part	ISO/IEC standard	ITU-T Rec.	First public release date	Latest amendment	Title	Description
Part 1	ISO/IEC 10918-1:1994	T.81 (09/92)	Sep 18, 1992		Requirements and guidelines	
Part 2	ISO/IEC 10918-2:1995	T.83 (11/94)	Nov 11, 1994		Compliance testing	Rules and checks for software conformance (to Part 1).
Part 3	ISO/IEC 10918-3:1997	T.84 (07/96)	Jul 3, 1996	Apr 1, 1999	Extensions	Set of extensions to improve the Part 1, including the Still Picture Interchange File Format (SPIFF).
Part 4	ISO/IEC 10918-4:2024	T.86 (06/98)	Jun 18, 1998		Appn Markers	methods for registering some of the parameters used to extend JPEG
Part 5	ISO/IEC 10918-5:2013	T.871 (05/11)	May 14, 2011		JPEG File Interchange Format (JFIF)	A popular format which has been the de facto file format for images encoded by the JPEG standard. In 2009, the JPEG Committee formally established an Ad Hoc Group to standardize JFIF as JPEG Part 5.
Part 6	ISO/IEC 10918-6:2013	T.872 (06/12)	Jun 2012		Application to printing systems	Specifies a subset of features and application tools for the interchange of images encoded according to the ISO/IEC 10918-1 for printing.
Part 7	ISO/IEC 10918-7:2023	T.873 (06/21)	May 2019	November 2023	Reference Software	Provides reference implementations of the JPEG core coding system

Ecma International TR/98 specifies the JPEG File Interchange Format (JFIF); the first edition was published in June 2009.

=== Patent controversy ===
In 2002, Forgent Networks asserted that it owned and would enforce patent rights on the JPEG technology, arising from a patent that had been filed on 27 October 1986, and granted on 6 October 1987: U.S. patent 4,698,672 by Compression Labs' Wen-Hsiung Chen and Daniel J. Klenke. While Forgent did not own Compression Labs at the time, Chen later sold Compression Labs to Forgent, before Chen went on to work for Cisco. This led to Forgent acquiring ownership over the patent. Forgent's 2002 announcement created a furor reminiscent of Unisys' attempts to assert its rights over the GIF image compression standard.

The JPEG committee investigated the patent claims in 2002 and were of the opinion that they were invalidated by prior art, a view shared by various experts.

Between 2002 and 2004, Forgent was able to obtain about US$105 million by licensing their patent to some 30 companies. In April 2004, Forgent sued 31 other companies to enforce further license payments. In July of the same year, a consortium of 21 large computer companies filed a countersuit, with the goal of invalidating the patent. In addition, Microsoft launched a separate lawsuit against Forgent in April 2005. In February 2006, the United States Patent and Trademark Office agreed to re-examine Forgent's JPEG patent at the request of the Public Patent Foundation. On 26 May 2006, the USPTO found the patent invalid based on prior art. The USPTO also found that Forgent knew about the prior art, yet it intentionally avoided telling the Patent Office. This made any appeal to reinstate the patent highly unlikely to succeed.

Forgent also possesses a similar patent granted by the European Patent Office in 1994, though it is unclear how enforceable it is.

As of 27 October 2006, the U.S. patent's 20-year term appears to have expired, and in November 2006, Forgent agreed to abandon enforcement of patent claims against use of the JPEG standard.

The JPEG committee has as one of its explicit goals that their standards (in particular their baseline methods) be implementable without payment of license fees, and they have secured appropriate license rights for their JPEG 2000 standard from over 20 large organizations.

Beginning in August 2007, another company, Global Patent Holdings, LLC claimed that its patent (U.S. patent 5,253,341) issued in 1993, is infringed by the downloading of JPEG images on either a website or through e-mail. If not invalidated, this patent could apply to any website that displays JPEG images. The patent was under reexamination by the U.S. Patent and Trademark Office from 2000 to 2007; in July 2007, the Patent Office revoked all of the original claims of the patent but found that an additional claim proposed by Global Patent Holdings (claim 17) was valid. Global Patent Holdings then filed a number of lawsuits based on claim 17 of its patent.

In its first two lawsuits following the reexamination, both filed in Chicago, Illinois, Global Patent Holdings sued the Green Bay Packers, CDW, Motorola, Apple, Orbitz, OfficeMax, Caterpillar, Kraft and Peapod as defendants. A third lawsuit was filed on 5 December 2007, in South Florida against ADT Security Services, AutoNation, Florida Crystals Corp., HearUSA, MovieTickets.com, Ocwen Financial Corp. and Tire Kingdom, and a fourth lawsuit on 8 January 2008, in South Florida against the Boca Raton Resort & Club. A fifth lawsuit was filed against Global Patent Holdings in Nevada. That lawsuit was filed by Zappos.com, Inc., which was allegedly threatened by Global Patent Holdings, and sought a judicial declaration that the '341 patent is invalid and not infringed.

Global Patent Holdings had also used the '341 patent to sue or threaten outspoken critics of broad software patents, including Gregory Aharonian and the anonymous operator of a website blog known as the "Patent Troll Tracker." On 21 December 2007, patent lawyer Vernon Francissen of Chicago asked the U.S. Patent and Trademark Office to reexamine the sole remaining claim of the '341 patent on the basis of new prior art.

On 5 March 2008, the U.S. Patent and Trademark Office agreed to reexamine the '341 patent, finding that the new prior art raised substantial new questions regarding the patent's validity. In light of the reexamination, the accused infringers in four of the five pending lawsuits have filed motions to suspend (stay) their cases until completion of the U.S. Patent and Trademark Office's review of the '341 patent. On 23 April 2008, a judge presiding over the two lawsuits in Chicago, Illinois granted the motions in those cases. On 22 July 2008, the Patent Office issued the first "Office Action" of the second reexamination, finding the claim invalid based on nineteen separate grounds. On 24 November 2009, a Reexamination Certificate was issued cancelling all claims.

Beginning in 2011 and continuing as of early 2013, an entity known as Princeton Digital Image Corporation, based in Eastern Texas, began suing large numbers of companies for alleged infringement of U.S. patent 4,813,056. Princeton claims that the JPEG image compression standard infringes the '056 patent and has sued large numbers of websites, retailers, camera and device manufacturers and resellers. The patent was originally owned and assigned to General Electric. The patent expired in December 2007, but Princeton has sued large numbers of companies for "past infringement" of this patent. (Under U.S. patent laws, a patent owner can sue for "past infringement" occurring up to six years before the filing of a lawsuit, so Princeton could theoretically have continued suing companies until December 2013.) As of March 2013, Princeton had suits pending in New York and Delaware against more than 55 companies. General Electric's involvement in the suit is unknown, although court records indicate that it assigned the patent to Princeton in 2009 and retains certain rights in the patent.

== Typical use ==
The JPEG compression algorithm operates at its best on photographs and paintings of realistic scenes with smooth variations of tone and color. For web usage, where reducing the amount of data used for an image is important for responsive presentation, JPEG's compression benefits make JPEG popular. JPEG/Exif is also the most common format saved by digital cameras.

However, JPEG is not well suited for line drawings and other textual or iconic graphics, where the sharp contrasts between adjacent pixels can cause noticeable artifacts. Such images are better saved in a lossless graphics format such as TIFF, GIF, PNG, or a raw image format. The JPEG standard includes a lossless coding mode, but that mode is not supported in most products.

As the typical use of JPEG is a lossy compression method, which reduces the image fidelity, it is inappropriate for exact reproduction of imaging data (such as some scientific and medical imaging applications and certain technical image processing work).

JPEG is also not well suited to files that will undergo multiple edits, as some image quality is lost each time the image is recompressed, particularly if the image is cropped or shifted, or if encoding parameters are changed – see digital generation loss for details. To prevent image information loss during sequential and repetitive editing, the first edit can be saved in a lossless format, subsequently edited in that format, then finally published as JPEG for distribution.

== JPEG compression ==
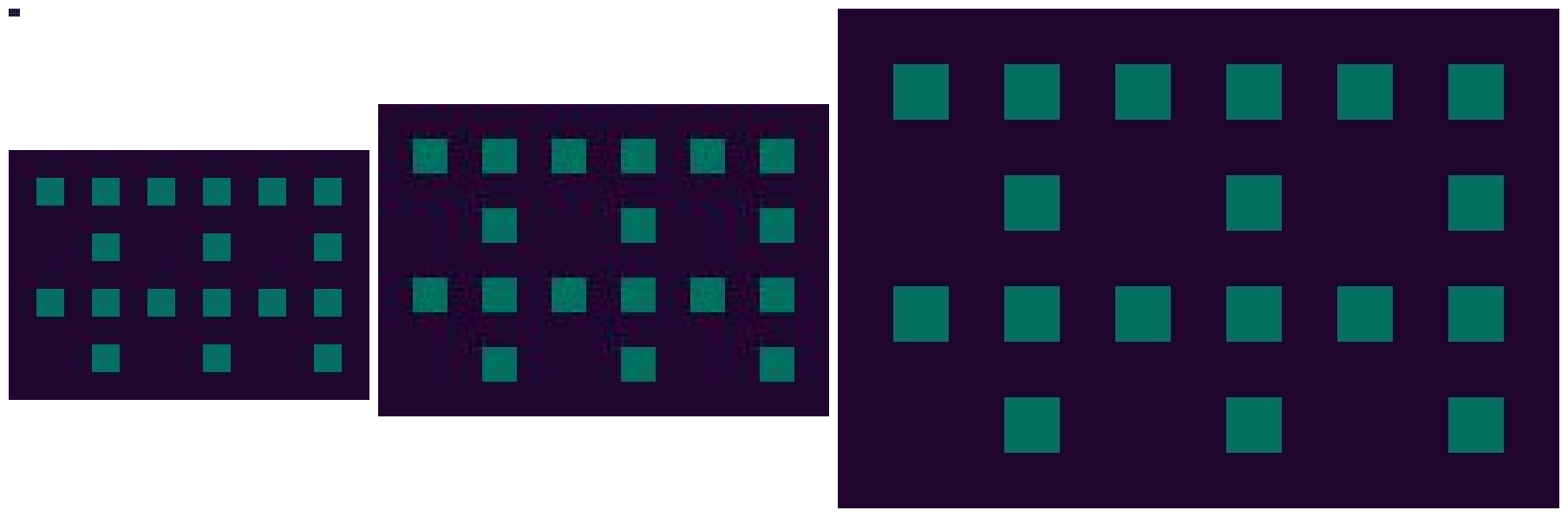
An example of JPEG scaling demonstrating the format's processing of images in blocks of 8×8 pixels. Images of small dimensions, when scaled by multiples of 8× and saved as JPEG files, produce much less visible compression artifacts, even at higher degrees of compression. The example images are, from left to right, scaled by 8× at 80% quality, 10× at 80% quality (producing much heavier artifacting) and 16× at 20% quality. The original pixels can be seen on the top left.

JPEG uses a lossy form of compression based on the discrete cosine transform (DCT). This mathematical operation converts each frame/field of the video source from the spatial (2D) domain into the frequency domain (a.k.a. transform domain). A perceptual model based loosely on how the human psychovisual system discards high-frequency information, i.e. sharp transitions in intensity, and color hue. In the transform domain, the process of reducing information is called quantization. In simpler terms, quantization is a method for optimally reducing a large number scale (with different occurrences of each number) into a smaller one, and the transform-domain is a convenient representation of the image because the high-frequency coefficients, which contribute less to the overall picture than other coefficients, are characteristically small-values with high compressibility. The quantized coefficients are then sequenced and losslessly packed into the output bitstream. Nearly all software implementations of JPEG permit user control over the compression ratio (as well as other optional parameters), allowing the user to trade off picture-quality for smaller file size. In embedded applications (such as miniDV, which uses a similar DCT-compression scheme), the parameters are pre-selected and fixed for the application.

The compression method is usually lossy, meaning that some original image information is lost and cannot be restored, possibly affecting image quality. There is an optional lossless mode defined in the JPEG standard. However, this mode is not widely supported in products.

There is also an interlaced progressive JPEG format, in which data is compressed in multiple passes of progressively higher detail. This is ideal for large images that will be displayed while downloading over a slow connection, allowing a reasonable preview after receiving only a portion of the data. However, support for progressive JPEGs is not universal. When progressive JPEGs are received by programs that do not support them (such as versions of Internet Explorer before Windows 7) the software displays the image only after it has been completely downloaded.

There are also many medical imaging, traffic and camera applications that create and process 12-bit JPEG images both grayscale and color. 12-bit JPEG format is included in an Extended part of the JPEG specification. The libjpeg codec supports 12-bit JPEG and there even exists a high-performance version.

=== Lossless editing ===
Several alterations to a JPEG image can be performed losslessly (that is, without recompression and the associated quality loss) as long as the image size is a multiple of 1 MCU block (Minimum Coded Unit) (usually 16 pixels in both directions, for 4:2:0 chroma subsampling). Utilities that implement this include:

- jpegtran and its GUI, Jpegcrop.
- IrfanView using "JPG Lossless Crop (PlugIn)" and "JPG Lossless Rotation (PlugIn)", which require installing the JPG_TRANSFORM plugin.
- FastStone Image Viewer using "Lossless Crop to File" and "JPEG Lossless Rotate".
- XnViewMP using "JPEG lossless transformations".
- ACDSee supports lossless rotation (but not lossless cropping) with its "Force lossless JPEG operations" option.

Blocks can be rotated in 90-degree increments, flipped in the horizontal, vertical and diagonal axes and moved about in the image. Not all blocks from the original image need to be used in the modified one.

The top and left edge of a JPEG image must lie on an 8 × 8 pixel block boundary (or 16 × 16 pixel for larger MCU sizes), but the bottom and right edge need not do so. This limits the possible lossless crop operations, and prevents flips and rotations of an image whose bottom or right edge does not lie on a block boundary for all channels (because the edge would end up on top or left, where – as aforementioned – a block boundary is obligatory).

Rotations where the image is not a multiple of 8 or 16, which value depends upon the chroma subsampling, are not lossless. Rotating such an image causes the blocks to be recomputed which results in loss of quality.

When using lossless cropping, if the bottom or right side of the crop region is not on a block boundary, then the rest of the data from the partially used blocks will still be present in the cropped file and can be recovered. It is also possible to transform between baseline and progressive formats without any loss of quality, since the only difference is the order in which the coefficients are placed in the file.

Furthermore, several JPEG images can be losslessly joined, as long as they were saved with the same quality and the edges coincide with block boundaries.

== JPEG files ==
The file format known as "JPEG Interchange Format" (JIF) is specified in Annex B of the standard. However, this "pure" file format is rarely used, primarily because of the difficulty of programming encoders and decoders that fully implement all aspects of the standard and because of certain shortcomings of the standard:

- Color space definition
- Component sub-sampling registration
- Pixel aspect ratio definition.

Several additional standards have evolved to address these issues. The first of these, released in 1992, was the JPEG File Interchange Format (JFIF), followed in recent years by Exchangeable image file format (Exif) and ICC color profiles. Both of these formats use the actual JIF byte layout, consisting of different markers, but in addition, employ one of the JIF standard's extension points, namely the application markers: JFIF uses APP0, while Exif uses APP1. Within these segments of the file that were left for future use in the JIF standard and are not read by it, these standards add specific metadata.

Thus, in some ways, JFIF is a cut-down version of the JIF standard in that it specifies certain constraints (such as not allowing all the different encoding modes), while in other ways, it is an extension of JIF due to the added metadata. The documentation for the original JFIF standard states:

JPEG File Interchange Format is a minimal file format which enables JPEG bitstreams to be exchanged between a wide variety of platforms and applications. This minimal format does not include any of the advanced features found in the TIFF JPEG specification or any application specific file format. Nor should it, for the only purpose of this simplified format is to allow the exchange of JPEG compressed images.

Image files that employ JPEG compression are commonly called "JPEG files", and are stored in variants of the JIF image format. Most image capture devices (such as digital cameras) that output JPEG are actually creating files in the Exif format, the format that the camera industry has standardized on for metadata interchange. On the other hand, since the Exif standard does not allow color profiles, most image editing software stores JPEG in JFIF format, and includes the APP1 segment from the Exif file to include the metadata in an almost-compliant way; the JFIF standard is interpreted somewhat flexibly.

Strictly speaking, the JFIF and Exif standards are incompatible, because each specifies that its marker segment (APP0 or APP1, respectively) appear first. In practice, most JPEG files contain a JFIF marker segment that precedes the Exif header. This allows older readers to correctly handle the older format JFIF segment, while newer readers also decode the following Exif segment, being less strict about requiring it to appear first.

=== JPEG filename extensions ===
The most common filename extensions for files employing JPEG compression are .jpg and .jpeg, though .jpe, .jfif and .jif are also used. It is also possible for JPEG data to be embedded in other file types – TIFF encoded files often embed a JPEG image as a thumbnail of the main image; and MP3 files can contain a JPEG of cover art in the ID3v2 tag.

=== Color profile ===
Many JPEG files embed an ICC color profile (color space). Commonly used color profiles include sRGB and Adobe RGB. Because these color spaces use a non-linear transformation, the dynamic range of an 8-bit JPEG file is about 11 stops; see gamma curve.

If the image doesn't specify color profile information (untagged), the color space is assumed to be sRGB for the purposes of display on webpages.

== Syntax and structure ==
A JPEG image consists of a sequence of segments, each beginning with a marker, each of which begins with a 0xFF byte, followed by a byte indicating what kind of marker it is. Some markers consist of just those two bytes; others are followed by two bytes (high then low), indicating the length of marker-specific payload data that follows. (The length includes the two bytes for the length, but not the two bytes for the marker.) Some markers are followed by entropy-coded data; the length of such a marker does not include the entropy-coded data. Note that consecutive 0xFF bytes are used as fill bytes for padding purposes, although this fill byte padding should only ever take place for markers immediately following entropy-coded scan data (see JPEG specification section B.1.1.2 and E.1.2 for details; specifically "In all cases where markers are appended after the compressed data, optional 0xFF fill bytes may precede the marker").

Within the entropy-coded data, after any 0xFF byte, a 0x00 byte is inserted by the encoder before the next byte, so that there does not appear to be a marker where none is intended, preventing framing errors. Decoders must skip this 0x00 byte. This technique, called byte stuffing (see JPEG specification section F.1.2.3), is only applied to the entropy-coded data, not to marker payload data. Note however that entropy-coded data has a few markers of its own; specifically the Reset markers (0xD0 through 0xD7), which are used to isolate independent chunks of entropy-coded data to allow parallel decoding, and encoders are free to insert these Reset markers at regular intervals (although not all encoders do this).

Common JPEG markers
Short name	Bytes	Payload	Name	Comments
SOI	0xFF, 0xD8	none	Start Of Image	
SOF0	0xFF, 0xC0	variable size	Start Of Frame (baseline DCT)	Indicates that this is a baseline DCT-based JPEG, and specifies the width, height, number of components, and component subsampling (e.g., 4:2:0).
SOF2	0xFF, 0xC2	variable size	Start Of Frame (progressive DCT)	Indicates that this is a progressive DCT-based JPEG, and specifies the width, height, number of components, and component subsampling (e.g., 4:2:0).
DHT	0xFF, 0xC4	variable size	Define Huffman Table(s)	Specifies one or more Huffman tables.
DQT	0xFF, 0xDB	variable size	Define Quantization Table(s)	Specifies one or more quantization tables.
DRI	0xFF, 0xDD	4 bytes	Define Restart Interval	Specifies the interval between RSTn markers, in Minimum Coded Units (MCUs). This marker is followed by two bytes indicating the fixed size so it can be treated like any other variable size segment.
SOS	0xFF, 0xDA	variable size	Start Of Scan	Begins a top-to-bottom scan of the image. In baseline DCT JPEG images, there is generally a single scan. Progressive DCT JPEG images usually contain multiple scans. This marker specifies which slice of data it will contain, and is immediately followed by entropy-coded data.
RSTn	0xFF, 0xDn (n=0..7)	none	Restart	Inserted every r macroblocks, where r is the restart interval set by a DRI marker. Not used if there was no DRI marker. The low three bits of the marker code cycle in value from 0 to 7.
APPn	0xFF, 0xEn	variable size	Application-specific	For example, an Exif JPEG file uses an APP1 marker to store metadata, laid out in a structure based closely on TIFF.
COM	0xFF, 0xFE	variable size	Comment	Contains a text comment.
EOI	0xFF, 0xD9	none	End Of Image	

There are other Start Of Frame markers that introduce other kinds of JPEG encodings.

Since several vendors might use the same APPn marker type, application-specific markers often begin with a standard or vendor name (e.g., "Exif" or "Adobe") or some other identifying string.

At a restart marker, block-to-block predictor variables are reset, and the bitstream is synchronized to a byte boundary. Restart markers provide means for recovery after bitstream error, such as transmission over an unreliable network or file corruption. Since the runs of macroblocks between restart markers may be independently decoded, these runs may be decoded in parallel.

== JPEG codec example ==
Although a JPEG file can be encoded in various ways, most commonly it is done with JFIF encoding. The encoding process consists of several steps:

1. The representation of the colors in the image is converted from RGB to Y′C_{B}C_{R}, consisting of one luma component (Y'), representing brightness, and two chroma components, (C_{B} and C_{R}), representing color. This step is sometimes skipped.
2. The resolution of the chroma data is reduced, usually by a factor of 2 or 3. This reflects the fact that the eye is less sensitive to fine color details than to fine brightness details.
3. The image is split into blocks of 8×8 pixels, and for each block, each of the Y, C_{B}, and C_{R} data undergoes the discrete cosine transform (DCT). A DCT is similar to a Fourier transform in the sense that it produces a kind of spatial frequency spectrum.
4. The amplitudes of the frequency components are quantized. Human vision is much more sensitive to small variations in color or brightness over large areas than to the strength of high-frequency brightness variations. Therefore, the magnitudes of the high-frequency components are stored with a lower accuracy than the low-frequency components. The quality setting of the encoder (for example 50 or 95 on a scale of 0–100 in the Independent JPEG Group's library) affects to what extent the resolution of each frequency component is reduced. If an excessively low quality setting is used, the high-frequency components are discarded altogether.
5. The resulting data for all 8×8 blocks is further compressed with a lossless algorithm, a variant of Huffman encoding.

The decoding process reverses these steps, except the quantization because it is irreversible. In the remainder of this section, the encoding and decoding processes are described in more detail.

=== Encoding ===
Many of the options in the JPEG standard are not commonly used, and as mentioned above, most image software uses the simpler JFIF format when creating a JPEG file, which among other things specifies the encoding method. Here is a brief description of one of the more common methods of encoding when applied to an input that has 24 bits per pixel (eight each of red, green, and blue). This particular option is a lossy data compression method. They are represented in matrices below.

==== Color space transformation ====
First, the image should be converted from RGB (by default sRGB, but other color spaces are possible) into a different color space called Y′C_{B}C_{R} (or, informally, YCbCr). It has three components Y', C_{B} and C_{R}: the Y' component represents the brightness of a pixel, and the C_{B} and C_{R} components represent the chrominance (split into blue and red components). This is basically the same color space as used by digital color television as well as digital video including video DVDs. The Y′C_{B}C_{R} color space conversion allows greater compression without a significant effect on perceptual image quality (or greater perceptual image quality for the same compression). The compression is more efficient because the brightness information, which is more important to the eventual perceptual quality of the image, is confined to a single channel. This more closely corresponds to the perception of color in the human visual system. The color transformation also improves compression by statistical decorrelation.

A particular conversion to Y′C_{B}C_{R} is specified in the JFIF standard, and should be performed for the resulting JPEG file to have maximum compatibility. However, some JPEG implementations in "highest quality" mode do not apply this step and instead keep the color information in the RGB color model, where the image is stored in separate channels for red, green and blue brightness components. This results in less efficient compression, and would not likely be used when file size is especially important.

==== Downsampling ====
Due to the densities of color- and brightness-sensitive receptors in the human eye, humans can see considerably more fine detail in the brightness of an image (the Y' component) than in the hue and color saturation of an image (the Cb and Cr components). Using this knowledge, encoders can be designed to compress images more efficiently.

The transformation into the Y′C_{B}C_{R} color model enables the next usual step, which is to reduce the spatial resolution of the Cb and Cr components (called "downsampling" or "chroma subsampling"). The ratios at which the downsampling is ordinarily done for JPEG images are 4:4:4 (no downsampling), 4:2:2 (reduction by a factor of 2 in the horizontal direction), or (most commonly) 4:2:0 (reduction by a factor of 2 in both the horizontal and vertical directions). For the rest of the compression process, Y', Cb and Cr are processed separately and in a very similar manner.

==== Block splitting ====
After subsampling, each channel must be split into 8×8 blocks. Depending on chroma subsampling, this yields Minimum Coded Unit (MCU) blocks of size 8×8 (4:4:4 – no subsampling), 16×8 (4:2:2), or most commonly 16×16 (4:2:0). In video compression MCUs are called macroblocks.

If the data for a channel does not represent an integer number of blocks then the encoder must fill the remaining area of the incomplete blocks with some form of dummy data. Filling the edges with a fixed color (for example, black) can create ringing artifacts along the visible part of the border; repeating the edge pixels is a common technique that reduces (but does not necessarily eliminate) such artifacts, and more sophisticated border filling techniques can also be applied.

==== Discrete cosine transform ====
The 8×8 sub-image shown in 8-bit grayscale

Next, each 8×8 block of each component (Y, Cb, Cr) is converted to a frequency-domain representation, using a normalized, two-dimensional type-II discrete cosine transform (DCT), see Citation 1 in discrete cosine transform. The DCT is sometimes referred to as "type-II DCT" in the context of a family of transforms as in discrete cosine transform, and the corresponding inverse (IDCT) is denoted as "type-III DCT".

As an example, one such 8×8 8-bit subimage might be:

$$\left[
\begin{array}{rrrrrrrr}
52 & 55 & 61 & 66 & 70 & 61 & 64 & 73 \\
63 & 59 & 55 & 90 & 109 & 85 & 69 & 72 \\
62 & 59 & 68 & 113 & 144 & 104 & 66 & 73 \\
63 & 58 & 71 & 122 & 154 & 106 & 70 & 69 \\
67 & 61 & 68 & 104 & 126 & 88 & 68 & 70 \\
79 & 65 & 60 & 70 & 77 & 68 & 58 & 75 \\
85 & 71 & 64 & 59 & 55 & 61 & 65 & 83 \\
87 & 79 & 69 & 68 & 65 & 76 & 78 & 94
\end{array}
\right].$$

Before computing the DCT of the 8×8 block, its values are shifted from a positive range to one centered on zero. For an 8-bit image, each entry in the original block falls in the range $[0, 255]$. The midpoint of the range (in this case, the value 128) is subtracted from each entry to produce a data range that is centered on zero, so that the modified range is $[-128, 127]$. This step reduces the dynamic range requirements in the DCT processing stage that follows.

This step results in the following values:

$$g=
\begin{array}{c}
x \\
\longrightarrow \\
\left[
\begin{array}{rrrrrrrr}
-76 & -73 & -67 & -62 & -58 & -67 & -64 & -55 \\
-65 & -69 & -73 & -38 & -19 & -43 & -59 & -56 \\
-66 & -69 & -60 & -15 & 16 & -24 & -62 & -55 \\
-65 & -70 & -57 & -6 & 26 & -22 & -58 & -59 \\
-61 & -67 & -60 & -24 & -2 & -40 & -60 & -58 \\
-49 & -63 & -68 & -58 & -51 & -60 & -70 & -53 \\
-43 & -57 & -64 & -69 & -73 & -67 & -63 & -45 \\
-41 & -49 & -59 & -60 & -63 & -52 & -50 & -34
\end{array}
\right]
\end{array}
\Bigg\downarrow y.$$

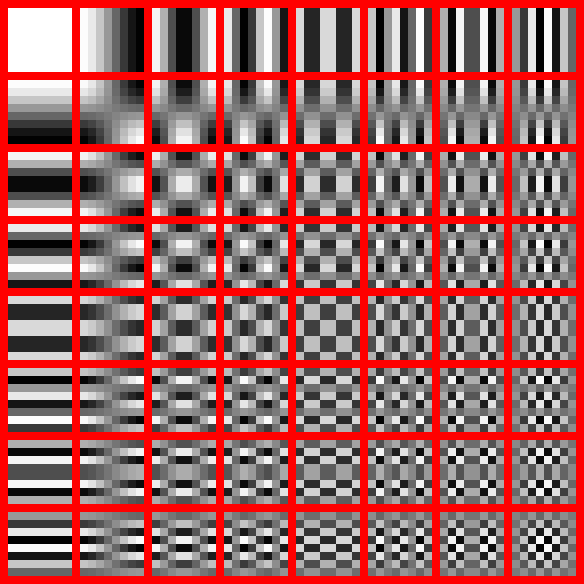
The DCT transforms an 8×8 block of input values to a linear combination of these 64 patterns. The patterns are referred to as the two-dimensional DCT basis functions, and the output values are referred to as transform coefficients. The horizontal index is $u$ and the vertical index is $v$.

The next step is to take the two-dimensional DCT, which is given by:

$$\ G_{u,v} =
\frac{1}{4}
\alpha(u)
\alpha(v)
\sum_{x=0}^7
\sum_{y=0}^7
g_{x,y}
\cos \left[\frac{(2x+1)u\pi}{16} \right]
\cos \left[\frac{(2y+1)v\pi}{16} \right]$$

where

- $\ u$ is the horizontal spatial frequency, for the integers $\ 0 \leq u < 8$.
- $\ v$ is the vertical spatial frequency, for the integers $\ 0 \leq v < 8$.
- $\alpha(u)$ and $\alpha(v)$ are normalizing scale factors to make the transformation orthonormal with
  $$\alpha(i) =
\begin{cases}
\frac{1}{\sqrt{2}}, & \mbox{if }i=0 \\
1, & \mbox{otherwise}
\end{cases}$$
- $\ g_{x,y}$ is the pixel value at coordinates $\ (x,y)$
- $\ G_{u,v}$ is the DCT coefficient at coordinates $\ (u,v).$

If we perform this transformation on our matrix above, we get the following (rounded to the nearest two digits beyond the decimal point):

$$G=
\begin{array}{c}
u \\
\longrightarrow \\
\left[
\begin{array}{rrrrrrrr}
-415.38 & -30.19 & -61.20 & 27.24 & 56.12 & -20.10 & -2.39 & 0.46 \\
4.47 & -21.86 & -60.76 & 10.25 & 13.15 & -7.09 & -8.54 & 4.88 \\
-46.83 & 7.37 & 77.13 & -24.56 & -28.91 & 9.93 & 5.42 & -5.65 \\
-48.53 & 12.07 & 34.10 & -14.76 & -10.24 & 6.30 & 1.83 & 1.95 \\
12.12 & -6.55 & -13.20 & -3.95 & -1.87 & 1.75 & -2.79 & 3.14 \\
-7.73 & 2.91 & 2.38 & -5.94 & -2.38 & 0.94 & 4.30 & 1.85 \\
-1.03 & 0.18 & 0.42 & -2.42 & -0.88 & -3.02 & 4.12 & -0.66 \\
-0.17 & 0.14 & -1.07 & -4.19 & -1.17 & -0.10 & 0.50 & 1.68
\end{array}
\right]
\end{array}
\Bigg\downarrow v.$$

Note the top-left corner entry with the rather large magnitude. This is the DC coefficient (also called the constant component), which defines the basic hue for the entire block. The remaining 63 coefficients are the AC coefficients (also called the alternating components). The advantage of the DCT is its tendency to aggregate most of the signal in one corner of the result, as may be seen above. The quantization step to follow accentuates this effect while simultaneously reducing the overall size of the DCT coefficients, resulting in a signal that is easy to compress efficiently in the entropy stage.

The DCT temporarily increases the bit-depth of the data, since the DCT coefficients of an 8-bit/component image take up to 11 or more bits (depending on fidelity of the DCT calculation) to store. This may force the codec to temporarily use 16-bit numbers to hold these coefficients, doubling the size of the image representation at this point; these values are typically reduced back to 8-bit values by the quantization step. The temporary increase in size at this stage is not a performance concern for most JPEG implementations, since typically only a very small part of the image is stored in full DCT form at any given time during the image encoding or decoding process.

==== Quantization ====
The human eye is good at seeing small differences in brightness over a relatively large area, but not so good at distinguishing the exact strength of a high frequency brightness variation. This allows one to greatly reduce the amount of information in the high frequency components. This is done by simply dividing each component in the frequency domain by a constant for that component, and then rounding to the nearest integer. This rounding operation is the only lossy operation in the whole process (other than chroma subsampling) if the DCT computation is performed with sufficiently high precision. As a result of this, it is typically the case that many of the higher frequency components are rounded to zero, and many of the rest become small positive or negative numbers, which take many fewer bits to represent.

The elements in the quantization matrix control the compression ratio, with larger values producing greater compression. A typical quantization matrix (for a quality of 50% as specified in the original JPEG Standard), is as follows:

$$Q=
\begin{bmatrix}
16 & 11 & 10 & 16 & 24 & 40 & 51 & 61 \\
12 & 12 & 14 & 19 & 26 & 58 & 60 & 55 \\
14 & 13 & 16 & 24 & 40 & 57 & 69 & 56 \\
14 & 17 & 22 & 29 & 51 & 87 & 80 & 62 \\
18 & 22 & 37 & 56 & 68 & 109 & 103 & 77 \\
24 & 35 & 55 & 64 & 81 & 104 & 113 & 92 \\
49 & 64 & 78 & 87 & 103 & 121 & 120 & 101 \\
72 & 92 & 95 & 98 & 112 & 100 & 103 & 99
\end{bmatrix}.$$

The quantized DCT coefficients are computed with

$$B_{j,k} = \mathrm{round} \left( \frac{G_{j,k}}{Q_{j,k}} \right) \mbox{ for } j=0,1,2,\ldots,7; k=0,1,2,\ldots,7$$

where $G$ is the unquantized DCT coefficients; $Q$ is the quantization matrix above; and $B$ is the quantized DCT coefficients.

Using this quantization matrix with the DCT coefficient matrix from above results in:

Left: a final image is built up from a series of basis functions. Right: each of the DCT basis functions that comprise the image, and the corresponding weighting coefficient. Middle: the basis function, after multiplication by the coefficient: this component is added to the final image. For clarity, the 8×8 macroblock in this example is magnified by 10x using bilinear interpolation.

$$B=
\left[
\begin{array}{rrrrrrrr}
-26 & -3 & -6 & 2 & 2 & -1 & 0 & 0 \\
0 & -2 & -4 & 1 & 1 & 0 & 0 & 0 \\
-3 & 1 & 5 & -1 & -1 & 0 & 0 & 0 \\
-3 & 1 & 2 & -1 & 0 & 0 & 0 & 0 \\
1 & 0 & 0 & 0 & 0 & 0 & 0 & 0 \\
0 & 0 & 0 & 0 & 0 & 0 & 0 & 0 \\
0 & 0 & 0 & 0 & 0 & 0 & 0 & 0 \\
0 & 0 & 0 & 0 & 0 & 0 & 0 & 0
\end{array}
\right].$$

For example, using −415 (the DC coefficient) and rounding to the nearest integer

$$\mathrm{round}
\left(
\frac{-415.37}{16}
\right)
=
\mathrm{round}
\left(
-25.96
\right)
=
-26.$$

Notice that most of the higher-frequency elements of the sub-block (i.e., those with an x or y spatial frequency greater than 4) are quantized into zero values.

==== Entropy coding ====
Zigzag ordering of JPEG image components

Entropy coding is a special form of lossless data compression. It involves arranging the image components in a "zigzag" order employing run-length encoding (RLE) algorithm that groups similar frequencies together, inserting length coding zeros, and then using Huffman coding on what is left.

The JPEG standard also allows, but does not require, decoders to support the use of arithmetic coding, which is mathematically superior to Huffman coding. However, this feature has rarely been used, as it was historically covered by patents requiring royalty-bearing licenses, and because it is slower to encode and decode compared to Huffman coding. Arithmetic coding typically makes files about 5–7% smaller.

The previous quantized DC coefficient is used to predict the current quantized DC coefficient. The difference between the two is encoded rather than the actual value. The encoding of the 63 quantized AC coefficients does not use such prediction differencing.

The zigzag sequence for the above quantized coefficients are shown below. (The format shown is just for ease of understanding/viewing.)

−26
−3	0
−3	−2	−6
2	−4	1	−3
1	1	5	1	2
−1	1	−1	2	0	0
0	0	0	−1	−1	0	0
0	0	0	0	0	0	0	0
0	0	0	0	0	0	0
0	0	0	0	0	0
0	0	0	0	0
0	0	0	0
0	0	0
0	0
0

If the i-th block is represented by $B_i$ and positions within each block are represented by $(p,q)$ where $p = 0, 1, ..., 7$ and $q = 0, 1, ..., 7$, then any coefficient in the DCT image can be represented as $B_i (p,q)$. Thus, in the above scheme, the order of encoding pixels (for the i-th block) is $B_i (0,0)$, $B_i (0,1)$, $B_i (1,0)$, $B_i (2,0)$, $B_i (1,1)$, $B_i (0,2)$, $B_i (0,3)$, $B_i (1,2)$ and so on.

Baseline sequential JPEG encoding and decoding processes

This encoding mode is called baseline sequential encoding. Baseline JPEG also supports progressive encoding. While sequential encoding encodes coefficients of a single block at a time (in a zigzag manner), progressive encoding encodes similar-positioned batch of coefficients of all blocks in one go (called a scan), followed by the next batch of coefficients of all blocks, and so on. For example, if the image is divided into N 8×8 blocks $B_0,B_1,B_2,...,B_{n-1}$, then a 3-scan progressive encoding encodes DC component, $B_i (0,0)$ for all blocks, i.e., for all $i = 0, 1, 2, ..., N-1$, in first scan. This is followed by the second scan which encoding a few more components (assuming four more components, they are $B_i (0,1)$ to $B_i (1,1)$, still in a zigzag manner) coefficients of all blocks (so the sequence is: $B_0 (0,1),B_0 (1,0),B_0 (2,0),B_0 (1,1),B_1 (0,1),B_1 (1,0),...,B_N (2,0),B_N (1,1)$), followed by all the remained coefficients of all blocks in the last scan.

Once all similar-positioned coefficients have been encoded, the next position to be encoded is the one occurring next in the zigzag traversal as indicated in the figure above. It has been found that baseline progressive JPEG encoding usually gives better compression as compared to baseline sequential JPEG due to the ability to use different Huffman tables (see below) tailored for different frequencies on each "scan" or "pass" (which includes similar-positioned coefficients), though the difference is not too large.

In the rest of the article, it is assumed that the coefficient pattern generated is due to sequential mode.

In order to encode the above generated coefficient pattern, JPEG uses Huffman encoding. The JPEG standard provides general-purpose Huffman tables; encoders may also choose to generate Huffman tables optimized for the actual frequency distributions in images being encoded.

The process of encoding the zig-zag quantized data begins with a run-length encoding explained below, where:

- x is the non-zero, quantized AC coefficient.
- RUNLENGTH is the number of zeroes that came before this non-zero AC coefficient.
- SIZE is the number of bits required to represent x.
- AMPLITUDE is the bit-representation of x.

The run-length encoding works by examining each non-zero AC coefficient x and determining how many zeroes came before the previous AC coefficient. With this information, two symbols are created:

Symbol 1	Symbol 2
(RUNLENGTH, SIZE)	(AMPLITUDE)

Both RUNLENGTH and SIZE rest on the same byte, meaning that each only contains four bits of information. The higher bits deal with the number of zeroes, while the lower bits denote the number of bits necessary to encode the value of x.

This has the immediate implication of Symbol 1 being only able store information regarding the first 15 zeroes preceding the non-zero AC coefficient. However, JPEG defines two special Huffman code words. One is for ending the sequence prematurely when the remaining coefficients are zero (called "End-of-Block" or "EOB"), and another when the run of zeroes goes beyond 15 before reaching a non-zero AC coefficient. In such a case where 16 zeroes are encountered before a given non-zero AC coefficient, Symbol 1 is encoded "specially" as: (15, 0)(0).

The overall process continues until "EOB" – denoted by (0, 0) – is reached.

With this in mind, the sequence from earlier becomes:

(0, 2)(-3);(1, 2)(-3);(0, 2)(-2);(0, 3)(-6);(0, 2)(2);(0, 3)(-4);(0, 1)(1);(0, 2)(-3);(0, 1)(1);(0, 1)(1);
(0, 3)(5);(0, 1)(1);(0, 2)(2);(0, 1)(-1);(0, 1)(1);(0, 1)(-1);(0, 2)(2);(5, 1)(-1);(0, 1)(-1);(0, 0);

(The first value in the matrix, −26, is the DC coefficient; it is not encoded the same way. See above.)

From here, frequency calculations are made based on occurrences of the coefficients. In our example block, most of the quantized coefficients are small numbers that are not preceded immediately by a zero coefficient. These more-frequent cases will be represented by shorter code words.

=== Compression ratio and artifacts ===
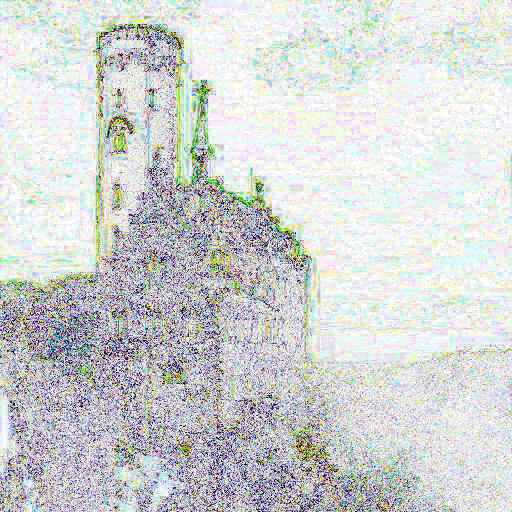
This image shows the pixels that are different between a non-compressed image and the same image JPEG compressed with a quality setting of 50. Darker means a larger difference. Note especially the changes occurring near sharp edges and having a block-like shape.

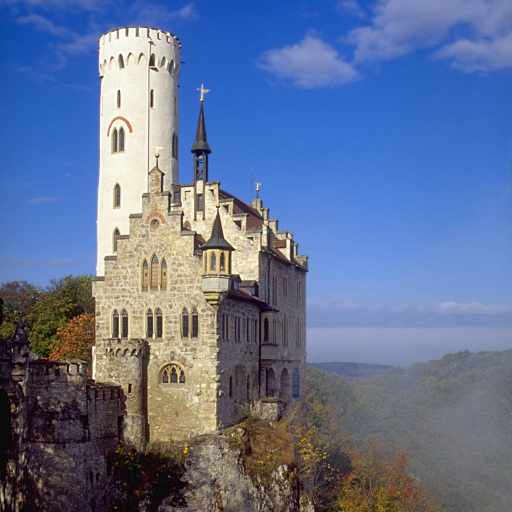
The original image

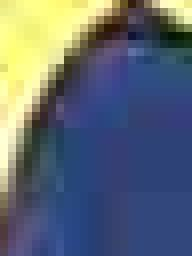
The compressed 8×8 squares are visible in the scaled-up picture, together with other visual artifacts of the lossy compression.

The resulting compression ratio can be varied according to need by being more or less aggressive in the divisors used in the quantization phase. Ten to one compression usually results in an image that cannot be distinguished by eye from the original. A compression ratio of 100:1 is usually possible, but will look distinctly artifacted compared to the original. The appropriate level of compression depends on the use to which the image will be put.

External image
- Illustration of edge busyness

Those who use the World Wide Web may be familiar with the irregularities known as compression artifacts that appear in JPEG images, which may take the form of noise around contrasting edges (especially curves and corners), or "blocky" images. These are due to the quantization step of the JPEG algorithm. They are especially noticeable around sharp corners between contrasting colors (text is a good example, as it contains many such corners). The analogous artifacts in MPEG video are referred to as mosquito noise, as the resulting "edge busyness" and spurious dots, which change over time, resemble mosquitoes swarming around the object.

These artifacts can be reduced by choosing a lower level of compression; they may be completely avoided by saving an image using a lossless file format, though this will result in a larger file size. The images created with ray-tracing programs have noticeable blocky shapes on the terrain. Certain low-intensity compression artifacts might be acceptable when simply viewing the images, but can be emphasized if the image is subsequently processed, usually resulting in unacceptable quality. Consider the example below, demonstrating the effect of lossy compression on an edge detection processing step.

Image	Lossless compression	Lossy compression
Original		
Processed by Canny edge detector		

Some programs allow the user to vary the amount by which individual blocks are compressed. Stronger compression is applied to areas of the image that show fewer artifacts. This way it is possible to manually reduce JPEG file size with less loss of quality.

Since the quantization stage always results in a loss of information, JPEG standard is always a lossy compression codec. (Information is lost both in quantizing and rounding of the floating-point numbers.) Even if the quantization matrix is a matrix of ones, information will still be lost in the rounding step.

=== Decoding ===
Decoding to display the image consists of doing all the above in reverse.

Taking the DCT coefficient matrix (after adding the difference of the DC coefficient back in)

$$\left[
\begin{array}{rrrrrrrr}
-26 & -3 & -6 & 2 & 2 & -1 & 0 & 0 \\
0 & -2 & -4 & 1 & 1 & 0 & 0 & 0 \\
-3 & 1 & 5 & -1 & -1 & 0 & 0 & 0 \\
-3 & 1 & 2 & -1 & 0 & 0 & 0 & 0 \\
1 & 0 & 0 & 0 & 0 & 0 & 0 & 0 \\
0 & 0 & 0 & 0 & 0 & 0 & 0 & 0 \\
0 & 0 & 0 & 0 & 0 & 0 & 0 & 0 \\
0 & 0 & 0 & 0 & 0 & 0 & 0 & 0
\end{array}
\right]$$

and taking the entry-for-entry product with the quantization matrix from above results in

$$\left[
\begin{array}{rrrrrrrr}
-416 & -33 & -60 & 32 & 48 & -40 & 0 & 0 \\
0 & -24 & -56 & 19 & 26 & 0 & 0 & 0 \\
-42 & 13 & 80 & -24 & -40 & 0 & 0 & 0 \\
-42 & 17 & 44 & -29 & 0 & 0 & 0 & 0 \\
18 & 0 & 0 & 0 & 0 & 0 & 0 & 0 \\
0 & 0 & 0 & 0 & 0 & 0 & 0 & 0 \\
0 & 0 & 0 & 0 & 0 & 0 & 0 & 0 \\
0 & 0 & 0 & 0 & 0 & 0 & 0 & 0
\end{array}
\right]$$

which closely resembles the original DCT coefficient matrix for the top-left portion.

The next step is to take the two-dimensional inverse DCT (a 2D type-III DCT), which is given by:

$f_{x,y} = \frac{1}{4} \sum_{u=0}^7 \sum_{v=0}^7 \alpha(u) \alpha(v) F_{u,v} \cos \left[\frac{(2x+1)u\pi}{16} \right] \cos \left[\frac{(2y+1)v\pi}{16} \right]$

where

- $\ x$ is the pixel row, for the integers $\ 0 \leq x < 8$.
- $\ y$ is the pixel column, for the integers $\ 0 \leq y < 8$.
- $\ \alpha(u)$ is the normalizing scale factor defined earlier, for the integers $\ 0 \leq u < 8$.
- $\ F_{u,v}$ is the approximated DCT coefficient at coordinates $\ (u,v).$
- $\ f_{x,y}$ is the reconstructed pixel value at coordinates $\ (x,y)$

Rounding the output to integer values (since the original had integer values) results in an image with values (still shifted down by 128)

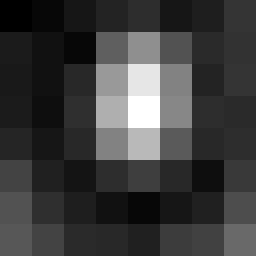
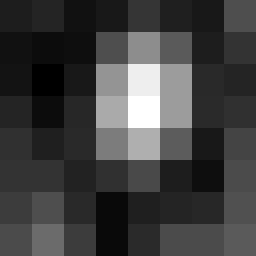
Slight differences are noticeable between the original (top) and decompressed image (bottom), which is most readily seen in the bottom-left corner.

$$\left[
\begin{array}{rrrrrrrr}
-66 & -63 & -71 & -68 & -56 & -65 & -68 & -46 \\
-71 & -73 & -72 & -46 & -20 & -41 & -66 & -57 \\
-70 & -78 & -68 & -17 & 20 & -14 & -61 & -63 \\
-63 & -73 & -62 & -8 & 27 & -14 & -60 & -58 \\
-58 & -65 & -61 & -27 & -6 & -40 & -68 & -50 \\
-57 & -57 & -64 & -58 & -48 & -66 & -72 & -47 \\
-53 & -46 & -61 & -74 & -65 & -63 & -62 & -45 \\
-47 & -34 & -53 & -74 & -60 & -47 & -47 & -41
\end{array}
\right]$$

and adding 128 to each entry

$$\left[
\begin{array}{rrrrrrrr}
62 & 65 & 57 & 60 & 72 & 63 & 60 & 82 \\
57 & 55 & 56 & 82 & 108 & 87 & 62 & 71 \\
58 & 50 & 60 & 111 & 148 & 114 & 67 & 65 \\
65 & 55 & 66 & 120 & 155 & 114 & 68 & 70 \\
70 & 63 & 67 & 101 & 122 & 88 & 60 & 78 \\
71 & 71 & 64 & 70 & 80 & 62 & 56 & 81 \\
75 & 82 & 67 & 54 & 63 & 65 & 66 & 83 \\
81 & 94 & 75 & 54 & 68 & 81 & 81 & 87
\end{array}
\right].$$

This is the decompressed subimage. In general, the decompression process may produce values outside the original input range of $[0, 255]$. If this occurs, the decoder needs to clip the output values so as to keep them within that range to prevent overflow when storing the decompressed image with the original bit depth.

The decompressed subimage can be compared to the original subimage (also see images to the right) by taking the difference (original − uncompressed) results in the following error values:

$$\left[
\begin{array}{rrrrrrrr}
-10 & -10 & 4 & 6 & -2 & -2 & 4 & -9 \\
6 & 4 & -1 & 8 & 1 & -2 & 7 & 1 \\
4 & 9 & 8 & 2 & -4 & -10 & -1 & 8 \\
-2 & 3 & 5 & 2 & -1 & -8 & 2 & -1 \\
-3 & -2 & 1 & 3 & 4 & 0 & 8 & -8 \\
8 & -6 & -4 & -0 & -3 & 6 & 2 & -6 \\
10 & -11 & -3 & 5 & -8 & -4 & -1 & -0 \\
6 & -15 & -6 & 14 & -3 & -5 & -3 & 7
\end{array}
\right]$$

with an average absolute error of about 5 values per pixels (i.e., $\frac{1}{64} \sum_{x=0}^7 \sum_{y=0}^7 |e(x,y)| = 4.8750$).

The error is most noticeable in the bottom-left corner where the bottom-left pixel becomes darker than the pixel to its immediate right.

=== Required precision ===
The required implementation precision of a JPEG codec is implicitly defined through the requirements formulated for compliance to the JPEG standard. These requirements are specified in ITU.T Recommendation T.83 | ISO/IEC 10918-2. Unlike MPEG standards and many later JPEG standards, the above document defines both required implementation precisions for the encoding and the decoding process of a JPEG codec by means of a maximal tolerable error of the forwards and inverse DCT in the DCT domain as determined by reference test streams. For example, the output of a decoder implementation must not exceed an error of one quantization unit in the DCT domain when applied to the reference testing codestreams provided as part of the above standard. While unusual, and unlike many other and more modern standards, ITU.T T.83 | ISO/IEC 10918-2 does not formulate error bounds in the image domain.

== Effects of JPEG compression ==
JPEG compression artifacts blend well into photographs with detailed non-uniform textures, allowing higher compression ratios. Notice how a higher compression ratio first affects the high-frequency textures in the upper-left corner of the image, and how the contrasting lines become more fuzzy. The very high compression ratio severely affects the quality of the image, although the overall colors and image form are still recognizable. However, the precision of colors suffer less (for a human eye) than the precision of contours (based on luminance). This justifies the fact that images should be first transformed in a color model separating the luminance from the chromatic information, before subsampling the chromatic planes (which may also use lower quality quantization) in order to preserve the precision of the luminance plane with more information bits.

=== Sample photographs ===
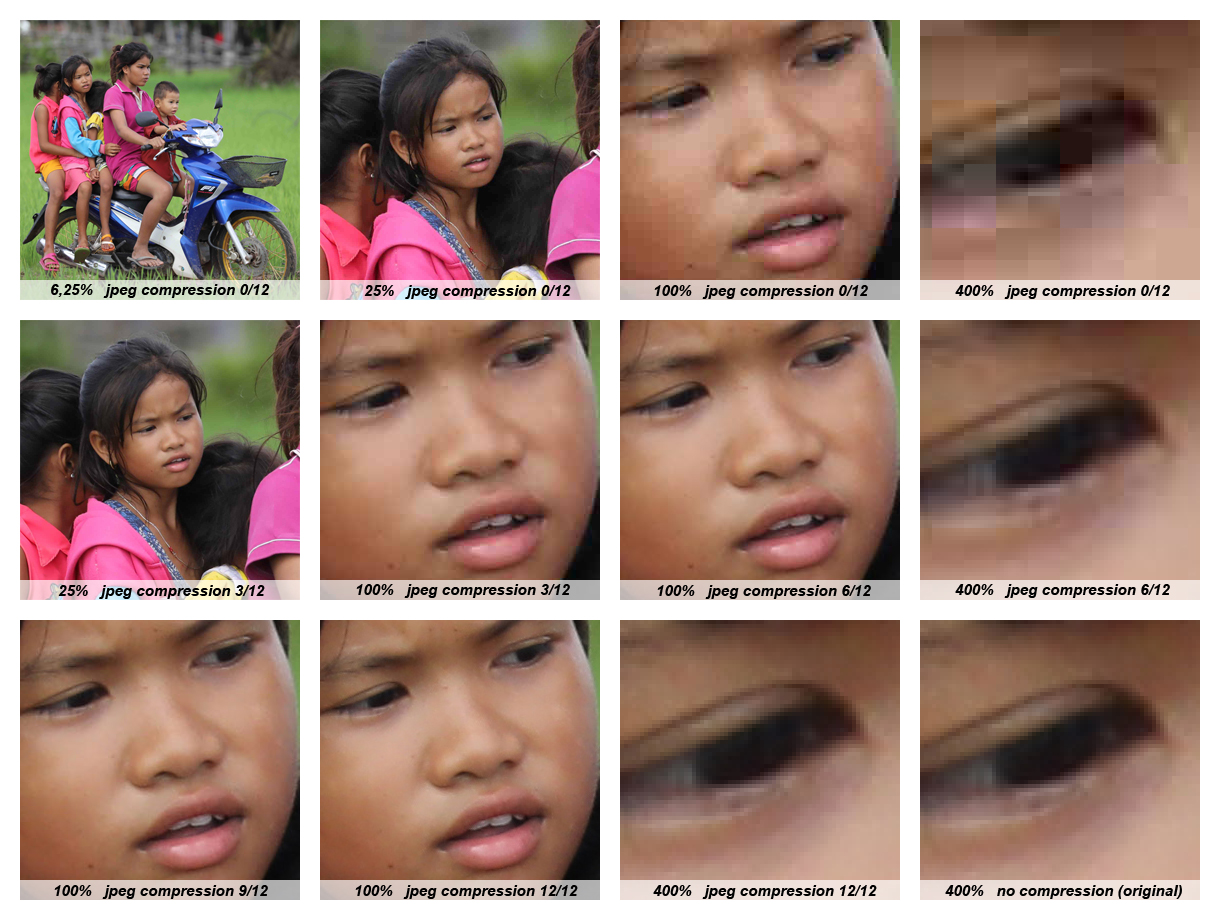
Visual impact of a jpeg compression on Photoshop on a picture of 4480x4480 pixels

For information, the uncompressed 24-bit RGB bitmap image below (73,242 pixels) would require 219,726 bytes (excluding all other information headers). The filesizes indicated below include the internal JPEG information headers and some metadata. For highest quality images (Q=100), about 8.25 bits per color pixel is required. On grayscale images, a minimum of 6.5 bits per pixel is enough (a comparable Q=100 quality color information requires about 25% more encoded bits). The highest quality image below (Q=100) is encoded at nine bits per color pixel, the medium quality image (Q=25) uses one bit per color pixel. For most applications, the quality factor should not go below 0.75 bit per pixel (Q=12.5), as demonstrated by the low quality image. The image at lowest quality uses only 0.13 bit per pixel, and displays very poor color. This is useful when the image will be displayed in a significantly scaled-down size. A method for creating better quantization matrices for a given image quality using PSNR instead of the Q factor is described in Minguillón & Pujol (2001).

Note: The above images are not IEEE / CCIR / EBU test images, and the encoder settings are not specified or available.
Image	Quality	Size (bytes)	Compression ratio	Comment
	Highest quality (Q = 100)	81,447	2.7:1	Extremely minor artifacts
	High quality (Q = 50)	14,679	15:1	Initial signs of subimage artifacts
	Medium quality (Q = 25)	9,407	23:1	Stronger artifacts; loss of high frequency information
	Low quality (Q = 10)	4,787	46:1	Severe high frequency loss leads to obvious artifacts on subimage boundaries ("macroblocking")
	Lowest quality (Q = 1)	1,523	144:1	Extreme loss of color and detail; the leaves are nearly unrecognizable.

The medium quality photo uses only 4.3% of the storage space required for the uncompressed image, but has little noticeable loss of detail or visible artifacts. However, once a certain threshold of compression is passed, compressed images show increasingly visible defects. See the article on rate–distortion theory for a mathematical explanation of this threshold effect. A particular limitation of JPEG in this regard is its non-overlapped 8×8 block transform structure. More modern designs such as JPEG 2000 and JPEG XR exhibit a more graceful degradation of quality as the bit usage decreases – by using transforms with a larger spatial extent for the lower frequency coefficients and by using overlapping transform basis functions.

== Lossless further compression ==
From 2004 to 2008, new research emerged on ways to further compress the data contained in JPEG images without modifying the represented image. This has applications in scenarios where the original image is only available in JPEG format, and its size needs to be reduced for archiving or transmission. Standard general-purpose compression tools cannot significantly compress JPEG files.

Typically, such schemes take advantage of improvements to the naive scheme for coding DCT coefficients, which fails to take into account:

- Correlations between magnitudes of adjacent coefficients in the same block;
- Correlations between magnitudes of the same coefficient in adjacent blocks;
- Correlations between magnitudes of the same coefficient/block in different channels;
- The DC coefficients when taken together resemble a downscale version of the original image multiplied by a scaling factor. Well-known schemes for lossless coding of continuous-tone images can be applied, achieving somewhat better compression than the Huffman coded DPCM used in JPEG.

Some standard but rarely used options already exist in JPEG to improve the efficiency of coding DCT coefficients: the arithmetic coding option, and the progressive coding option (which produces lower bitrates because values for each coefficient are coded independently, and each coefficient has a significantly different distribution). Modern methods have improved on these techniques by reordering coefficients to group coefficients of larger magnitude together; using adjacent coefficients and blocks to predict new coefficient values; dividing blocks or coefficients up among a small number of independently coded models based on their statistics and adjacent values; and most recently, by decoding blocks, predicting subsequent blocks in the spatial domain, and then encoding these to generate predictions for DCT coefficients.

Typically, such methods can compress existing JPEG files between 15 and 25 percent, and for JPEGs compressed at low-quality settings, can produce improvements of up to 65%.

Several programs are available for lossless recompression of JPEG files. The files produced by such programs are not compatible with the JPEG standard and require special software to decode.

- StuffIt Deluxe 9, a proprietary archiver for Mac and Windows, released in 2005, can transcode JPEG files into the StuffIt Image Format, with a claimed file size reduction of up to 28%.
- PackJPG is a freely available tool based on the 2007 paper "Improved Redundancy Reduction for JPEG Files." As of version 2.5k of 2016, it reports a typical 20% reduction by transcoding.
- Lepton, developed by Dropbox and used in their file-storage service since 2016, replaces Huffman coding with arithmetic coding and a custom statistical model, for a 22% file size reduction. It can reconstruct a bitwise copy of the original JPEG file. The original implementation, written in C++ and distributed under the Apache License, is no longer actively maintained. Dropbox suggests users switch to a Rust reimplementation from Microsoft.
- Brunsli was developed by Google in 2017, and released as a standalone tool in 2019 under the MIT License. It claims a 22% file size reduction and can reconstruct a bitwise copy of the original JPEG file. Since then, Brunsli has been integrated into JPEG XL.
- JPEG XL is a general-purpose image format that can recompress most JPEG files and reconstruct a bitwise copy of the original JPEG file. The file size reductions are around 20% for high-quality images with 4:4:4 chroma subsampling produced by libjpeg and libjpeg-turbo. JPEG XL is an ISO/IEC standard, and several freely-licensed implementations are available.

== Derived formats for stereoscopic 3D ==
=== JPEG Stereoscopic ===
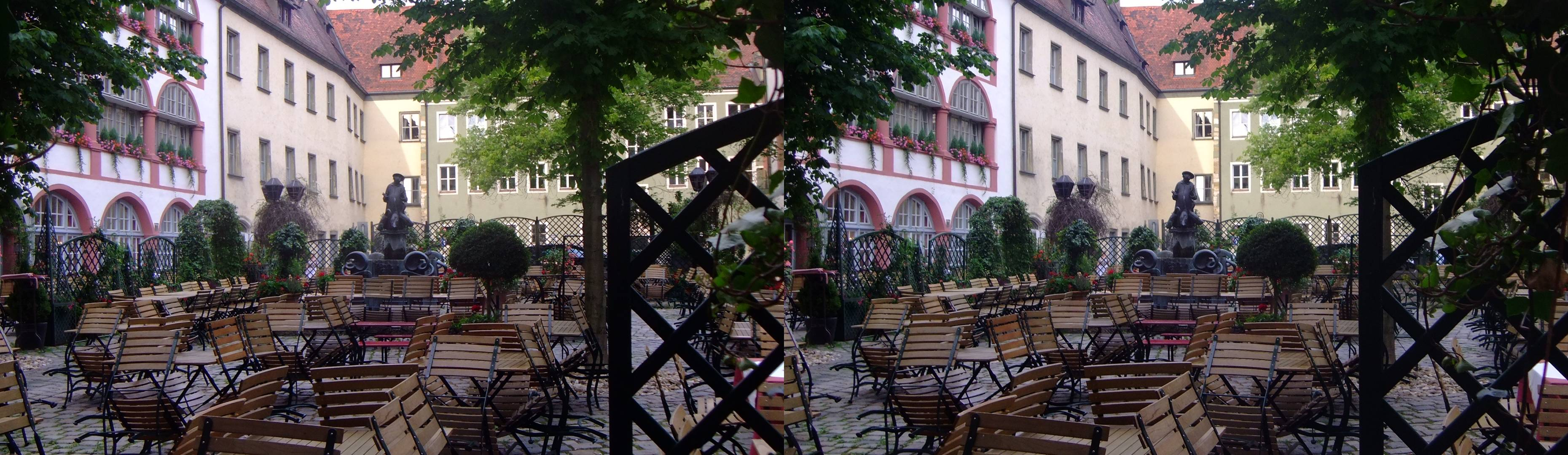
An example of a stereoscopic .JPS file

JPS is a stereoscopic JPEG image used for creating 3D effects from 2D images. It contains two static images, one for the left eye and one for the right eye; encoded as two side-by-side images in a single JPEG file. JPEG Stereoscopic (JPS, extension .jps) is a JPEG-based format for stereoscopic images. It has a range of configurations stored in the JPEG APP3 marker field, but usually contains one image of double width, representing two images of identical size in cross-eyed (i.e. left frame on the right half of the image and vice versa) side-by-side arrangement. This file format can be viewed as a JPEG without any special software, or can be processed for rendering in other modes.

=== JPEG Multi-Picture Format ===
JPEG Multi-Picture
- Filename extension: .mpo
- Uniform Type Identifier (UTI): public.mpo-image

JPEG Multi-Picture Format (MPO, extension .mpo) is a JPEG-based format for storing multiple images in a single file. It contains two or more JPEG files concatenated together. It also defines a JPEG APP2 marker segment for image description. Various devices use it to store 3D images, such as Fujifilm FinePix Real 3D W1, HTC Evo 3D, JVC GY-HMZ1U AVCHD/MVC extension camcorder, Nintendo 3DS, Panasonic Lumix DMC-TZ20, DMC-TZ30, DMC-TZ60, DMC-TS4 (FT4), and Sony DSC-HX7V. Other devices use it to store "preview images" that can be displayed on a TV.

In the last few years, due to the growing use of stereoscopic images, much effort has been spent by the scientific community to develop algorithms for stereoscopic image compression.

== Implementations ==
A very important implementation of a JPEG codec is the free programming library libjpeg of the Independent JPEG Group. It was first published in 1991 and was key for the success of the standard. This library was used in countless applications. The development went quiet in 1998; when libjpeg resurfaced with the 2009 version 7, it broke ABI compatibility with previous versions. Version 8 of 2010 introduced non-standard extensions, a decision criticized by the original IJG leader Tom Lane.

libjpeg-turbo, forked from the 1998 libjpeg 6b, improves on libjpeg with SIMD optimizations. Originally seen as a maintained fork of libjpeg, it has become more popular after the incompatible changes of 2009. In 2019, it became the ITU|ISO/IEC reference implementation as ISO/IEC 10918-7 and ITU-T T.873.

ISO/IEC Joint Photographic Experts Group maintains the other reference software implementation under the JPEG XT heading. It can encode both base JPEG (ISO/IEC 10918-1 and 18477–1) and JPEG XT extensions (ISO/IEC 18477 Parts 2 and 6–9), as well as JPEG-LS (ISO/IEC 14495). In 2016, "JPEG on steroids" was introduced as an option for the ISO JPEG XT reference implementation.

There is persistent interest in encoding JPEG in unconventional ways that maximize image quality for a given file size. In 2014, Mozilla created MozJPEG from libjpeg-turbo, a slower but higher-quality encoder intended for web images. In March 2017, Google released the open source project Guetzli, which trades off a much longer encoding time for smaller file size (similar to what Zopfli does for PNG and other lossless data formats).

In April 2024, Google introduced Jpegli, a new JPEG coding library that offers enhanced capabilities and a 35% compression ratio improvement at high quality compression settings, while the coding speed is comparable with MozJPEG.

== Successors ==
The Joint Photographic Experts Group has developed several newer standards meant to complement or replace the functionality of the original JPEG format.

=== JPEG LS ===
Originating in 1993 and published as ISO-14495-1/ITU-T.87, JPEG LS offers a low-complexity lossless file format which was more efficient than JPEG's original lossless implementation. It also features a lossy mode close to lossless. Its functionality is largely limited to that, and largely shares the same limitations of the original JPEG in other aspects.

=== JPEG 2000 ===
JPEG 2000 was published as ISO/IEC 15444 in December 2000. It is based on a discrete wavelet transform (DWT) and was designed to completely replace the original JPEG standard and exceed it in every way. It allows up to 38 bits per colour channel and 16384 channels, more than any other format, with a multitude of colour spaces, and thus high dynamic range (HDR). Furthermore, it supports alpha transparency coding, billions-by-billions pixel images, which is also more than any other format, and lossless compression. It has significantly improved lossy compression ratio with significantly less visible artefacts at strong compression levels.

=== JPEG XT ===
JPEG XT (ISO/IEC 18477) was published in June 2015; it extends base JPEG format with support for higher integer bit depths (up to 16 bit), high dynamic range imaging and floating-point coding, lossless coding, and alpha channel coding. Extensions are backward compatible with the base JPEG/JFIF file format and 8-bit lossy compressed image. JPEG XT uses an extensible file format based on JFIF. Extension layers are used to modify the JPEG 8-bit base layer and restore the high-resolution image. Existing software is forward compatible and can read the JPEG XT binary stream, though it would only decode the base 8-bit layer.

=== JPEG XL ===
JPEG XL (ISO/IEC 18181) was published in 2021–2022. It replaces the JPEG format with a new DCT-based royalty-free format and allows efficient transcoding as a storage option for traditional JPEG images. The new format is designed to exceed the still image compression performance shown by HEIF HM, Daala and WebP. It supports billion-by-billion pixel images, up to 32-bit-per-component high dynamic range with the appropriate transfer functions (PQ and HLG), patch encoding of synthetic images such as bitmap fonts and gradients, animated images, alpha channel coding, and a choice of RGB/YCbCr/ICtCp color encoding.

== See also ==
- AVIF
- Better Portable Graphics, a format based on intra-frame encoding of the HEVC
- C-Cube, an early implementer of JPEG in chip form
- Comparison of graphics file formats
- Deblocking filter (video), the similar deblocking methods could be applied to JPEG
- Design rule for Camera File system (DCF)
- FELICS, a lossless image codec
- File extensions
- Graphics editing program
- High Efficiency Image File Format, image container format for HEVC and other image coding formats
- Lenna, the traditional standard image used to test image processing algorithms
- Motion JPEG
- Ultra HDR, adds high dynamic range (HDR) support to JPEG with backwards compatibility
- WebP
