= Truncated binary encoding =

Truncated binary encoding is an entropy encoding typically used for uniform probability distributions with a finite alphabet. It is parameterized by an alphabet with total size of number n. It is a slightly more general form of binary encoding when n is not a power of two.

If n is a power of two, then the coded value for 0 ≤ x < n is the simple binary code for x of length log_{2}(n). Otherwise let k = floor(log_{2}(n)), such that 2^{k} < n < 2^{k+1}and let u = 2^{k+1} − n.

Truncated binary encoding assigns the first u symbols codewords of length k and then assigns the remaining n − u symbols the last n − u codewords of length k + 1. Because all the codewords of length k + 1 consist of an unassigned codeword of length k with a "0" or "1" appended, the resulting code is a prefix code.

== History ==
Used since at least 1984, phase-in codes, also known as economy codes, are also known as truncated binary encoding.

== Example with n = 5 ==
For example, for the alphabet {0, 1, 2, 3, 4}, n = 5 and 2^{2} ≤ n < 2^{3}, hence k = 2 and u = 2^{3} − 5 = 3. Truncated binary encoding assigns the first u symbols the codewords 00, 01, and 10, all of length 2, then assigns the last n − u symbols the codewords 110 and 111, the last two codewords of length 3.

For example, if n is 5, plain binary encoding and truncated binary encoding allocates the following codewords. Digits shown ~~struck~~ are not transmitted in truncated binary.

Truncated binary	Encoding			Standard binary
0	~~0~~	0	0	0
1	~~0~~	0	1	1
2	~~0~~	1	0	2
UNUSED	~~0~~	~~1~~	~~1~~	3
UNUSED	~~1~~	~~0~~	~~0~~	4
UNUSED	~~1~~	~~0~~	~~1~~	5/UNUSED
3	1	1	0	6/UNUSED
4	1	1	1	7/UNUSED

It takes 3 bits to encode n using straightforward binary encoding, hence 2^{3} − n = 8 − 5 = 3 are unused.

In numerical terms, to send a value x, where 0 ≤ x < n, and where there are 2^{k} ≤ n < 2^{k+1} symbols, there are u = 2^{k+1} − n unused entries when the alphabet size is rounded up to the nearest power of two. The process to encode the number x in truncated binary is: if x is less than u, encode it in k binary bits; if x is greater than or equal to u, encode the value x + u in k + 1 binary bits.

== Example with n = 10 ==
Another example, encoding an alphabet of size 10 (between 0 and 9) requires 4 bits, but there are 2^{4} − 10 = 6 unused codes, so input values less than 6 have the first bit discarded, while input values greater than or equal to 6 are offset by 6 to the end of the binary space. (Unused patterns are not shown in this table.)

Input value	Offset	Offset value	Standard binary	Truncated binary
0	0	0	~~0~~000	000
1	0	1	~~0~~001	001
2	0	2	~~0~~010	010
3	0	3	~~0~~011	011
4	0	4	~~0~~100	100
5	0	5	~~0~~101	101
6	6	12	0110	1100
7	6	13	0111	1101
8	6	14	1000	1110
9	6	15	1001	1111

To decode, read the first k bits. If they encode a value less than u, decoding is complete. Otherwise, read an additional bit and subtract u from the result.

== Example with n = 7 ==
Here is a more extreme case: with n = 7 the next power of 2 is 8, so k = 2 and u = 2^{3} − 7 = 1:

Input value	Offset	Offset value	Standard binary	Truncated binary
0	0	0	~~0~~00	00
1	1	2	001	010
2	1	3	010	011
3	1	4	011	100
4	1	5	100	101
5	1	6	101	110
6	1	7	110	111

This last example demonstrates that a leading zero bit does not always indicate a short code; if u < 2^{k}, some long codes will begin with a zero bit.

== Simple algorithm ==
Generate the truncated binary encoding for a value x, 0 ≤ x < n, where n > 0 is the size of the alphabet containing x. n need not be a power of two.

string TruncatedBinary (int x, int n)
{
	// Set k = floor(log2(n)), i.e., k such that 2^k <= n < 2^(k+1).
	int k = 0, t = n;
	while (t > 1) { k++;  t >>= 1; }

	// Set u to the number of unused codewords = 2^(k+1) - n.
	int u = (1 << k + 1) - n;

	if (x < u)
        return Binary(x, k); 
    else
        return Binary(x + u, k + 1));
}

The routine Binary is expository; usually just the rightmost len bits of the variable x are desired. Here we simply output the binary code for x using len bits, padding with high-order 0s if necessary.

string Binary (int x, int len)
{
	string s = "";
	while (x != 0) {
		if (even(x))
            s = '0' + s;
		else  s = '1' + s;
		
		x >>= 1;
	}
	while (s.Length < len)
        s = '0' + s;
	return s;
}

== On efficiency ==
If n is not a power of two, and k-bit symbols are observed with probability p, then (k + 1)-bit symbols are observed with probability 1 − p. We can calculate the expected number of bits per symbol $b_e$ as

$$b_e = p k + (1 - p) (k + 1).$$

Raw encoding of the symbol has $b_u = k + 1$ bits. Then relative space saving s (see Data compression ratio) of the encoding can be defined as

$$s = 1 - \frac{b_e}{b_u} = 1 - \frac{p k + (1 - p) (k + 1)}{k + 1}.$$

When simplified, this expression leads to

$$s = \frac{p}{k + 1} = \frac{p}{b_u}.$$

This indicates that relative efficiency of truncated binary encoding increases as probability p of k-bit symbols increases, and the raw-encoding symbol bit-length $b_u$ decreases.

== See also ==
- Benford's law
- Golomb coding
