= Asure Software =

American software company

Asure Software, Inc.
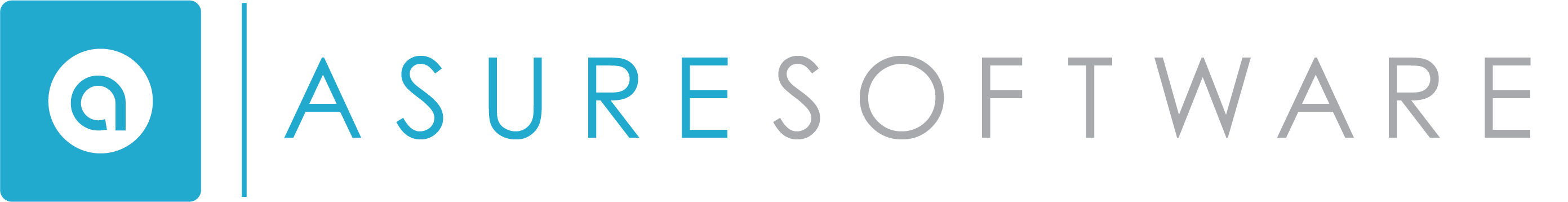
- Formerly: Forgent Networks, Inc. (1985–2007)
- Type: Public
- Traded as: Nasdaq: ASUR; Russell 2000 Index component
- Industry: Software as a service
- Founded: 1985; 41 years ago in Austin, Texas, U.S.
- Headquarters: 405 Colorado Street, Suite 1800, Austin, Texas, U.S.
- Area served: United States
- Key people: Pat Goepel (chairman & CEO); Eyal Goldstein (president & CRO); John Pence (CFO); Yasmine Rodriguez (CTO)
- Revenue: ▲US$95.83 million (2022)
- Number of employees: 420
- Website: asuresoftware.com

Asure Software, Inc. is a software company. Prior to September 13, 2007, the company was known as Forgent Networks. After rebranding as Asure Software, the company expanded into offering human capital management (HCM) solutions, including payroll, time & attendance, talent management, human resource management, benefits administration and insurance services.

It also had a software division, NetSimplicity, which specialized in room scheduling and fixed assets' management software, which was spun off in 2019.

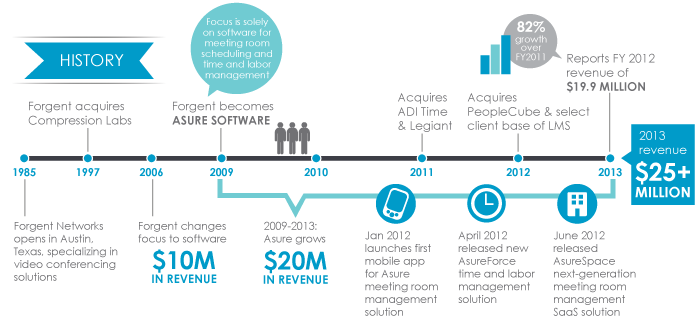
Asure Software Timeline

== Patents and litigation ==
=== JPEG ===
In 2002, while known as Forgent, the company claimed that through its subsidiary, Compression Labs, it owned the patent rights on the JPEG image compression standard, which is widely used on the World Wide Web. Its claim arose from a patent that had been filed on October 27, 1986, and granted on October 6, 1987: U.S. patent 4,698,672 by Wen-Hsiung Chen and Daniel J. Klenke. While Forgent did not own Compression Labs at the time, Chen later sold the company to Forgent before joining Cisco.

Critics claim that the legal principle of laches, hence not asserting one's rights in a timely manner, invalidates Forgent's claims on the patent. They also noted the similarity to Unisys' attempts to assert rights over the GIF image compression standard via LZW patent enforcement. The JPEG committee responded to Forgent's claims, stating that it believes prior art exists that would invalidate Forgent's claims, and launched a search for prior art evidence. The 1992 JPEG specification cited two earlier research papers written by Wen-Hsiung Chen, published in 1977 and 1984. JPEG representative Richard Clark also claimed that Chen sat in one of the JPEG committees, but Forgent denied this claim.

In April 2004, Forgent stated that 30 companies had already paid US$90 million in royalties. On April 23, lawsuits were filed against 31 companies, including Adobe Systems, Apple Computer and IBM, for infringement of their patent. On September 26, 2005, Axis Communications, one of the defendants, announced a settlement with Compression Labs Inc.; the terms were not disclosed. As of late October 2005, six companies were known to have licensed the patent from Forgent including Adobe, Macromedia, Axis, Color Dreams, and Research In Motion.

On May 25, 2006, the United States Patent and Trademark Office rejected the broadest part of Forgent's claims, stating prior art submitted by the Public Patent Foundation invalidated those claims. PubPat's Executive Director, Dan Ravicher, says that the submitters knew about the prior art but failed to tell the USPTO about it. On August 11, 2006, Forgent received notice from the NASDAQ stock market regarding non-compliance with the minimum bid price rule, which can lead to delisting, before coming back into compliance in January 2007.

The company issued a press release on November 1, 2006, stating that they settled their remaining claims against roughly 60 companies for a total of $8 million which was paid by, among other companies, Dell, Hewlett-Packard, IBM, Microsoft, and Sun Microsystems.

=== Digital video recorders ===
Forgent Networks shifted its focus to a computer controlled video system, allowing playback during recording. While the patent was filed in 1991, the first litigation was initiated in 2005. On May 21, 2007, U.S. District Court of Eastern Texas ruled in favor of EchoStar Communications Corporation, on grounds that the Forgent patent is invalid.

=== Asure Software ===
After Forgent Networks acquired iEmployee and changed its name to Asure Software, the website of the combined company no longer listed information related to the two patents - '672 and '746, unlike the old Forgent Networks website.

=== Proxy Fight ===
In 2008, the company was the target of a proxy fight launched by Pinnacle Fund ("Pinnacle") and Red Oak Partners, managed by David Sandberg. After negotiations, a slate of 5 new directors was elected on August 28, 2009 to replace the previous board.

== Acquisitions ==
On September 13, 2007, Forgent acquired iEmployee.

On October 3, 2011, Asure Software announced that it had acquired ADI Time, a vendor of cloud computing time and attendance software and labor management services. On March 21, 2016, it announced the acquisition of Mangrove Employer Services, which developed human resource management software; it began massive layoffs of previous Mangrove employees in June 2016.

In May 2017, Asure acquired the Tampa-based company Compass HRM Inc.

In April 2018, Asure acquired Austin HR, an Austin based HR Consulting & Payroll & Benefit Administration company. On December 2, 2019, Asure Software announced that it completed the sale of its Workspace Management Business to FM:Systems.
