= Instantaneously trained neural networks =

Instantaneously trained neural networks are feedforward artificial neural networks that create a new hidden neuron node for each novel training sample. The weights to this hidden neuron separate out not only this training sample but others that are near it, thus providing generalization. This separation is done using the nearest hyperplane that can be written down instantaneously. In the two most important implementations the neighborhood of generalization either varies with the training sample (CC1 network) or remains constant (CC4 network). These networks use unary coding for an effective representation of the data sets.

This type of network was first proposed in a 1993 paper of Subhash Kak. Since then, instantaneously trained neural networks have been proposed as models of short term learning and used in web search, and financial time series prediction applications. They have also been used in instant classification of documents and for deep learning and data mining.

As in other neural networks, their normal use is as software, but they have also been implemented in hardware using FPGAs and by optical implementation.

== CC4 network ==
In the CC4 network, which is a three-stage network, the number of input nodes is one more than the size of the training vector, with the extra node serving as the biasing node whose input is always 1. For binary input vectors, the weights from the input nodes to the hidden neuron (say of index j) corresponding to the trained vector is given by the following formula:

$$w_{ij} = \begin{cases}
-1, & \mbox{for } x_i = 0\\
+1, & \mbox{for } x_i = 1\\
r-s+1, & \mbox{for } i = n+1
\end{cases}$$

where $r$ is the radius of generalization and $s$ is the Hamming weight (the number of 1s) of the binary sequence. From the hidden layer to the output layer the weights are 1 or -1 depending on whether the vector belongs to a given output class or not. The neurons in the hidden and output layers output 1 if the weighted sum to the input is 0 or positive and 0, if the weighted sum to the input is negative:

$$y = \left\{ \begin{matrix} 1 & \mbox{if } \sum x_i \ge 0\\ 0 & \mbox{if } \sum x_i< 0\end{matrix} \right.$$

== Other networks ==
The CC4 network has also been modified to include non-binary input with varying radii of generalization so that it effectively provides a CC1 implementation.

In feedback networks the Willshaw network as well as the Hopfield network are able to learn instantaneously.
