= Panasonic Lumix DMC-TZ60 =

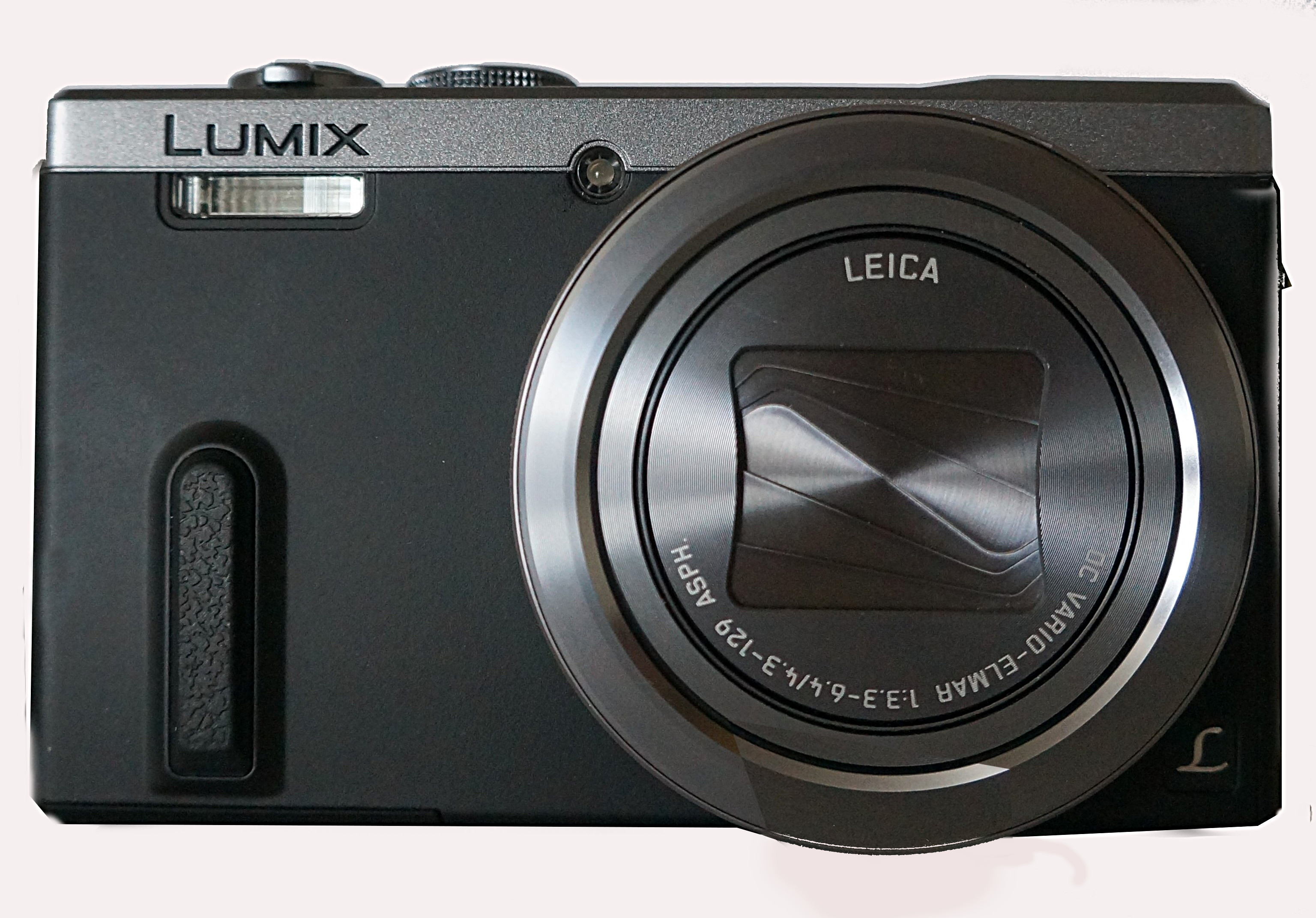

Overview
- Maker: Panasonic Lumix
- Type: Compact

Lens
- Lens: Leica DC Vario-Elmar
- F-numbers: 3.3 - 6.4

Sensor/medium
- Sensor type: CMOS
- Sensor size: 1/2.3" (6.17 x 4.55 mm)
- Maximum resolution: 18.1 megapixels
- Storage media: SD, SDHC, SDXC

Flash
- Flash: built-in

Shutter
- Shutter speeds: 4 - 1/2000

Viewfinder
- Viewfinder: Live Viewfinder

General
- Video recording: 1920 x 1080 pixels, 50p (FHD: 28 Mbps / AVCHD) (Sensor Output is 50fps)
- LCD screen: 3.0" LCD
- Battery: Li-ion Battery Pack ID-Security (3.6 V, 1250mAh, 4.5Wh)
- Dimensions: 110.6×64.3×34.4 mm (4.35×2.53×1.35 in)
- Weight: 240 g (8 oz) with Battery and SD Memory Card

Panasonic Lumix DMC-TZ60 (also known as the Panasonic Lumix DMC-ZS40 in North America) is a digital camera by Panasonic Lumix. The highest-resolution pictures it records is 18.1 megapixels.

== Properties ==
- LEICA DC
- 30x optical zoom
- High Sensitivity MOS sensor
- HYBRID O.I.S.+ stabilization
- GPS tagging

== See also ==
- List of superzoom compact cameras
