= ARC (file format) =

Type of data compression and archival format

- Filename extension: .arc, .ark
- Internet media type: application/octet-stream
- Uniform Type Identifier (UTI): public.archive.arc
- Developed by: System Enhancement Associates
- Type of format: Data compression

ARC is a lossless data compression and archival format by System Enhancement Associates (SEA). The file format and the program were both called ARC. The format is known as the subject of controversy in the 1980s, part of important debates over what would later be known as open formats.

ARC was extremely popular during the early days of the dial-up BBS. ARC was convenient as it combined the functions of the SQ program to compress files and the LU program to create .LBR archives of multiple files. The format was later replaced by the ZIP format, which offered better compression ratios and the ability to retain directory structures through the compression/decompression process.

The .arc filename extension is often used for several unrelated file archive-like file types. For example, the Internet Archive used its own ARC format to store multiple web resources into a single file. The FreeArc archiver also uses a .arc extension, but uses a completely different file format. Nintendo uses an unrelated "ARC" format for resources, such as audio, or text, in GameCube and Wii games. Several unofficial extractors exist for this type of ARC file.

== File Format ==
Component files are stored sequentially within an archive, followed by an end-of-archive marker 0x1A 0x00. Each entry is preceded by a 29-byte header, which contains the directory information. All multi-byte values in the header are stored in little-endian byte order. Archive entries are normally maintained in sorted name order. The format of the 29-byte archive header is as follows:

Offset (bytes)	Size (bytes)	Description
0	1	Start of archive header (0x1A).
1	1	Compression method/version.
2	13	ASCII file name, null-terminated.
15	4	Compressed size.
19	2	File date, in 16-bit MS-DOS format: Bits 15:9 = year - 1980; Bits 8:5 = month of year; Bits 4:0 = day of month; (All zero means no date.)
21	2	File time, in 16-bit MS-DOS format: Bits 15:11 = hour (24-hour clock); Bits 10:5 = minute; Bits 4:0 = second / 2
23	2	16-bit cyclic redundancy check (CRC) value of the uncompressed data
25	4	Uncompressed size. (This field is not present for files with compression method 1. I.e., in this case the header is only 25 bytes long.)

=== Compression Methods ===
The nature of the compression method is indicated by the header version number placed in each archive entry, as follows:

- 0 - End of archive marker (remaining bytes not present)
- 1 - Unpacked: old style header, no compression
- 2 - Unpacked: new style header, no compression
- 3 - Packed: RLE encoding, compression of repeated characters only.
- 4 - Squeezed: compression of repeated characters plus Huffman Squeezing.
- 5 - Crunched: Lempel-Ziv packing of repeated strings (old style), was added as of version 4.0
- 6 - Crunched: Lempel-Ziv packing of repeated strings (new style), was added as of version 4.1
- 7 - Crunched: LZW packing with improved hash function, which yields speed improvements of 20-25%, and was added as of version 4.6
- 8 - Crunched: dynamic Lempel-Ziv packing with variable code size and an adaptive block reset, was added as of version 5.0.
- 9 - Squashed: dynamic Lempel-Ziv packing, with larger hash table. A slight modification of type 8, first used by Phil Katz in his PKARC utilities. The primary difference is the use of a hash table twice as large as for type 8, and that this algorithm called Squashing, doesn't perform run-length encoding on the input data.

=== Format of the MS-DOS time stamp ===
The 32-bit MS-DOS time stamp is limited to an even count of seconds, since the count for seconds is only 5 bits wide.

Date fields:

Offset (bytes)	31	30	29	28	27	26	25	24	23	22	21	20	19	18	17	16
Offset (bytes)	year - 1980							month				day				

Time fields:

Offset (bytes)	15	14	13	12	11	10	09	08	07	06	05	04	03	02	01	00
Offset (bytes)	hour					minute						second / 2				

=== CRC Computation ===
Archive files use a 16-bit cyclic redundancy check (CRC) for error control. The particular CRC polynomial used is $x^{16} + x^{15} + x^{2} + 1$, which is commonly known as "CRC-16" and is used in many data transmission protocols (e.g. DEC DDCMP and IBM BSC), as well as by most floppy disk controllers. Note that this differs from the CCITT polynomial ($x^{16} + x^{12} + x^{5} + 1$), which is used by the XMODEM-CRC protocol and the public domain CHEK program (although these do not adhere strictly to the CCITT standard).

== History ==
In 1985, Thom Henderson of System Enhancement Associates wrote a program called ARC, based on earlier programs such as ar, that not only grouped files into a single archive file but also compressed them to save disk space, a feature of great importance on early personal computers, where space was very limited and modem transmission speeds were very slow. The archive files produced by ARC had file names ending in ".ARC" and were thus sometimes called "arc files".

The source code for ARC was released by SEA in 1986 and subsequently ported to Unix and Atari ST in 1987 by Howard Chu. This more portable codebase was subsequently ported to other platforms, including VAX/VMS and IBM System/370 mainframes. Howard's work was also the first to disprove the prevalent belief that Lempel-Ziv encoded files could not be further compressed. Additional compression could be achieved by using Huffman coding on the LZW data, and Howard's version of ARC was the first program to demonstrate this property. This hybrid technique was later used in several other compression schemes by Phil Katz and others.

Later, Phil Katz developed his own shareware utilities, PKARC and PKXARC, to create archive files and extract their contents. These files worked with the archive file format used by ARC and were significantly faster than ARC on the IBM PC platform due to selective assembly language coding. Unlike SEA, which combined archive creation and archive file extraction in a single program, Katz divided these functions between two separate utilities, reducing the amount of memory needed to run them. PKARC also allowed the creation of self-extracting archives, which could unpack themselves without requiring an external file extraction utility.

Following the System Enhancement Associates, Inc. vs PKWARE Inc. and Phillip W. Katz lawsuit, SEA withdrew from the shareware market and developed ARC+Plus. This version included a full-screen user interface, with the last known version being 7.12. SEA was eventually sold to an unspecified Japanese company in 1992.

The ARC format is no longer common on PC desktops, but most antivirus scanners can still uncompress any ARC archives found in order to detect viruses within the compressed files.

== Lawsuits ==
In the late 1980s a dispute arose between SEA, maker of the ARC program, and PKWARE, Inc. (Phil Katz Software). SEA sued Katz for trademark and copyright infringement. An independent software expert, John Navas, was appointed by the court to compare the two programs, and stated that PKARC was a derivative work of ARC, pointing out that comments in both programs were often identical, including spelling errors.

On August 2, 1988, the plaintiff and defendants announced a settlement of the lawsuit, which included a Confidential Cross-License Agreement under which SEA licensed PKWARE for all the ARC-compatible programs published by PKWARE during the period beginning with the first release of PKXARC in late 1985 through July 31, 1988, in return for $62,500, which at the time was an undisclosed payment amount. In the agreement, PKWARE paid SEA to obtain a license that allowed the distribution of PKWARE's ARC-compatible programs until January 31, 1989, after which PKWARE would not license, publish or distribute any ARC compatible programs or utilities that process ARC compatible files. In exchange, PKWARE licensed SEA to use its source code for PKWARE's ARC-compatible programs. PKWARE also agreed to cease any use of SEA's trademark "ARC" and to change the names or marks used with PKWARE's programs to non-confusing designations. The remaining details of the agreement were sealed. In reaching the settlement, the defendants did not admit any fault or wrongdoing. The Wisconsin court order showed defendants were ordered to pay damages to plaintiff for defendants' acts of infringing Plaintiff's copyrights, trademark, and acts of unfair trade practices and unfair competition.

The leaked agreement document revealed under the settlement terms, the defendants had paid plaintiff $22,500 for past royalty payments, and $40,000 for expense reimbursements. In addition, defendants would pay plaintiff a royalty fee of 6.5% of all revenue received for ARC compatible programs on all orders received after the effective date of this Agreement, such revenue including any license fees or shareware registrations received after the expiration of the license, for ARC compatible programs. In exchange, plaintiff would also pay a commission in the amount of 6.5% of any license fees received by plaintiff from any licensee referred to plaintiff by defendants, whether before or after the license termination date.

After the lawsuit, PKWARE released one last version of his PKARC and PKXARC utilities under the new names "PKPAK" and "PKUNPAK", and from then on concentrated on developing the separate programs PKZIP and PKUNZIP, which were based on new and different file compression techniques and archive file formats. However, following the renaming, SEA filed a lawsuit against PKWARE for contempt, for continually using plaintiff's protected mark ARC, by turning ARC from noun into verb in the PKPAK manual. The United States District Court for the Eastern District of Wisconsin ruled SEA's motion was denied, and the defendant was entitled to recover the legal cost of $500.

The SEA vs. PKWARE dispute quickly expanded into one of the largest controversies the BBS world ever saw. The suit by SEA angered many shareware users who perceived that SEA was a "large, faceless corporation" and Katz was "the little guy". In fact, at the time, both SEA and PKWARE were small home-based companies. However, the community largely sided with Katz, due to the fact that SEA was attempting to retroactively declare the ARC file format to be closed and proprietary. Katz received positive publicity by releasing the APPNOTE.TXT specification documenting the ZIP file format, and declaring that the ZIP file format would always be free for competing software to implement. The net result was that the ARC format quickly dropped out of common use as the predominant compression format that PC-BBSs used for their file archives, and after a brief period of competing formats, the ZIP format was adopted as the predominant standard.

In an interview, Thom Henderson of SEA said that the main reason he dropped out of software development was because of his inability to emotionally cope with what he claimed was the hate mail campaign launched against him by Katz.

== See also ==
- List of archive formats
