= SQ (program) =

File compression program

- Developer: Richard Greenlaw
- Written in: C
- Operating system: DOS, CP/M

Squeeze
- Filename extension: .?Q?, .QQQ, .SQ
- Magic number: 76 FF
- Developed by: Richard Greenlaw
- Type of format: File compression format
- Compression: Lossless; RLE and Huffman

SQ (squeeze) is a computer program, devised by Richard (Dick) Greenlaw circa 1981, which was used in the early 1980s on both DOS and CP/M computer systems to compress files so they use less space.

Files compressed by SQ are identified by changing the middle initial of the extension to "Q", so that text files ended with the extension .TQT, executable files ended with the extension .CQM or .EQE, documents with .DQC, batch files with .BQT, etc. Files without extensions would gain .QQQ, and Unix ports of SQ typically appended .SQ to the end of the filename instead. SQ used a combination of Run-length encoding and static Huffman coding as the compression algorithm.

Groups of files were often combined into an archive using the LU program, which created .LBR files containing all the files needed for a particular group, such as all the files needed to install an application. Typically such files were either individually compressed (because LU did not compress files) or the LBR archive was itself compressed with SQ (similarly to the use of tar and gzip together).

With the development of the ARC program (which combined both compression and archiving into one program) and its ARC archive file format, SQ essentially became obsolete on most systems, except CP/M, which lacked an ARC port for several years. On CP/M systems, the CRUNCH compression program was written to implement the LZW algorithm (as ARC did) and plug the gap.
