= Hélène Barcelo =

Canadian-American mathematician

- Education: University of California, San Diego
- Title: Professor emerita
- Scientific career
- Fields: Algebraic combinatorics
- Workplaces: Arizona State University; Mathematical Sciences Research Institute
- Thesis: On the Action of the Symmetric Group on the Free Lie Algebra and on the Homology and Cohomology of the Partition Lattice (1988)
- Doctoral advisor: Adriano Garsia

Hélène Barcelo (born 11 November 1954) is a Canadian mathematician specializing in algebraic combinatorics. Within that field, her interests include combinatorial representation theory, homotopy theory, and arrangements of hyperplanes. She is Professor Emerita of Mathematics at Arizona State University, and Deputy Director Emerita of the Mathematical Sciences Research Institute (MSRI). She was editor-in-chief of the Journal of Combinatorial Theory, Series A, from 2001 to 2009.

== Education and career ==
Barcelo completed her Ph.D. from the University of California, San Diego, in 1988. Her dissertation, On the Action of the Symmetric Group on the Free Lie Algebra and on the Homology and Cohomology of the Partition Lattice, was supervised by Adriano Garsia.

She joined the Arizona State faculty after postdoctoral studies at the University of Michigan. She retired from Arizona State, becoming a professor emerita there, and became deputy director at MSRI in 2008.

== Recognition ==
From 2012-2014, Barcelo served as a Council Member at Large for the American Mathematical Society. She was elected to the 2018 class of fellows of the American Mathematical Society, to the 2019 class of fellows of the Association for Women in Mathematics, and to the 2021 class of Fellows of the American Association for the Advancement of Science.
