= Pittsburgh Plate Glass Enamel Plant =

- U.S. National Register of Historic Places
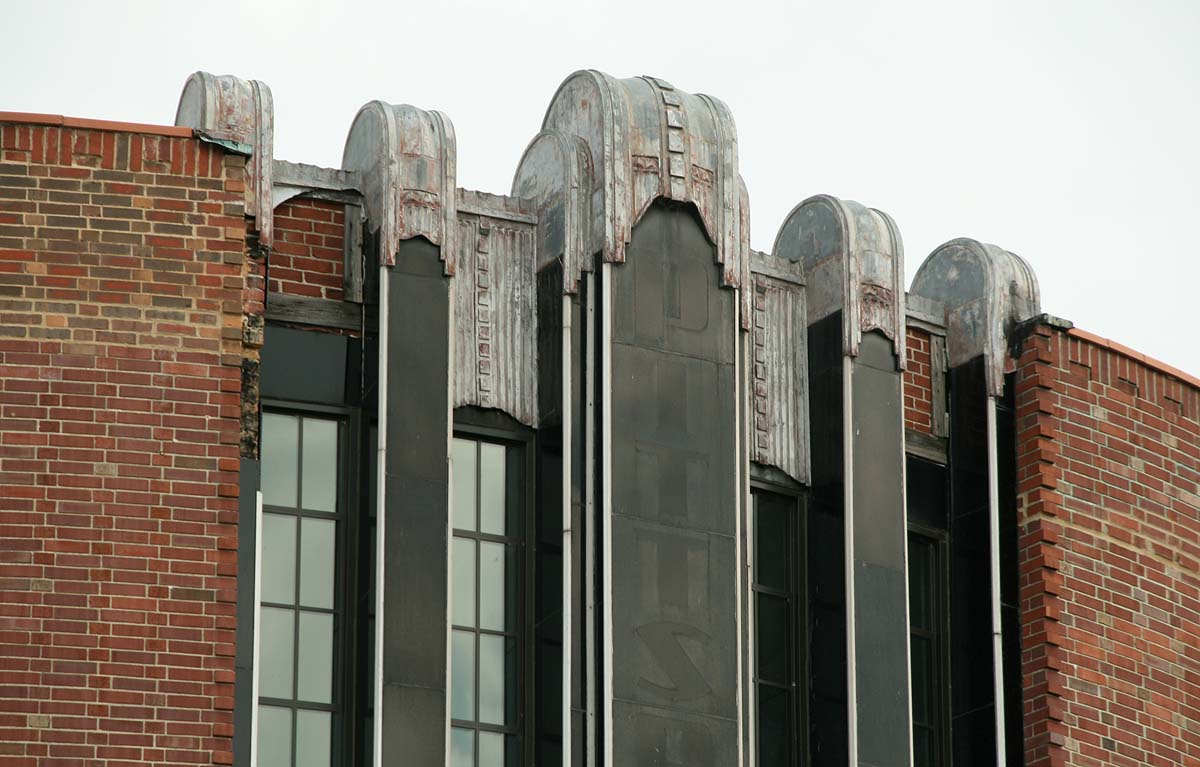
- Detail of the plant.
- Location: 201 E. Pittsburgh Ave. Milwaukee, Wisconsin
- Coordinates: 43.0292°N 87.9092°W
- Built: 1937
- Architect: Alexander C. Eschweiler
- Architectural style: Art Moderne
- NRHP reference No.: 09000851
- Added to NRHP: October 21, 2009

The Pittsburgh Plate Glass Enamel Plant is an Art Moderne-styled factory in Milwaukee, Wisconsin, built in 1937 by the Pittsburgh Plate Glass Company. In 2009 it was added to the National Register of Historic Places in 2009.

== History ==
The plant was constructed as part of the expansion of the paint and varnish division of what is now PPG Industries based in Pittsburgh. The building is four stories, 200 feet long, with a brick-clad exterior and a graceful glass tower at the northwest corner. It was designed by the firm of Eschweiler & Eschweiler. Hallmarks of the Art Moderne style are the simple, smooth shapes and curves resembling an airplane and the independence from any historic architectural styles. PPG manufactured enamel paint in the building from 1937 until 1976.

After Pittsburgh, Transpack made boxes in the plant until 2007. Renovated in 2008 for commercial and business use, the four-story building houses offices for Knight-Barry Title Group, and the headquarters for data security and compression company, PKWARE, Inc..
