= Jennifer Morse (mathematician) =

Mathematician

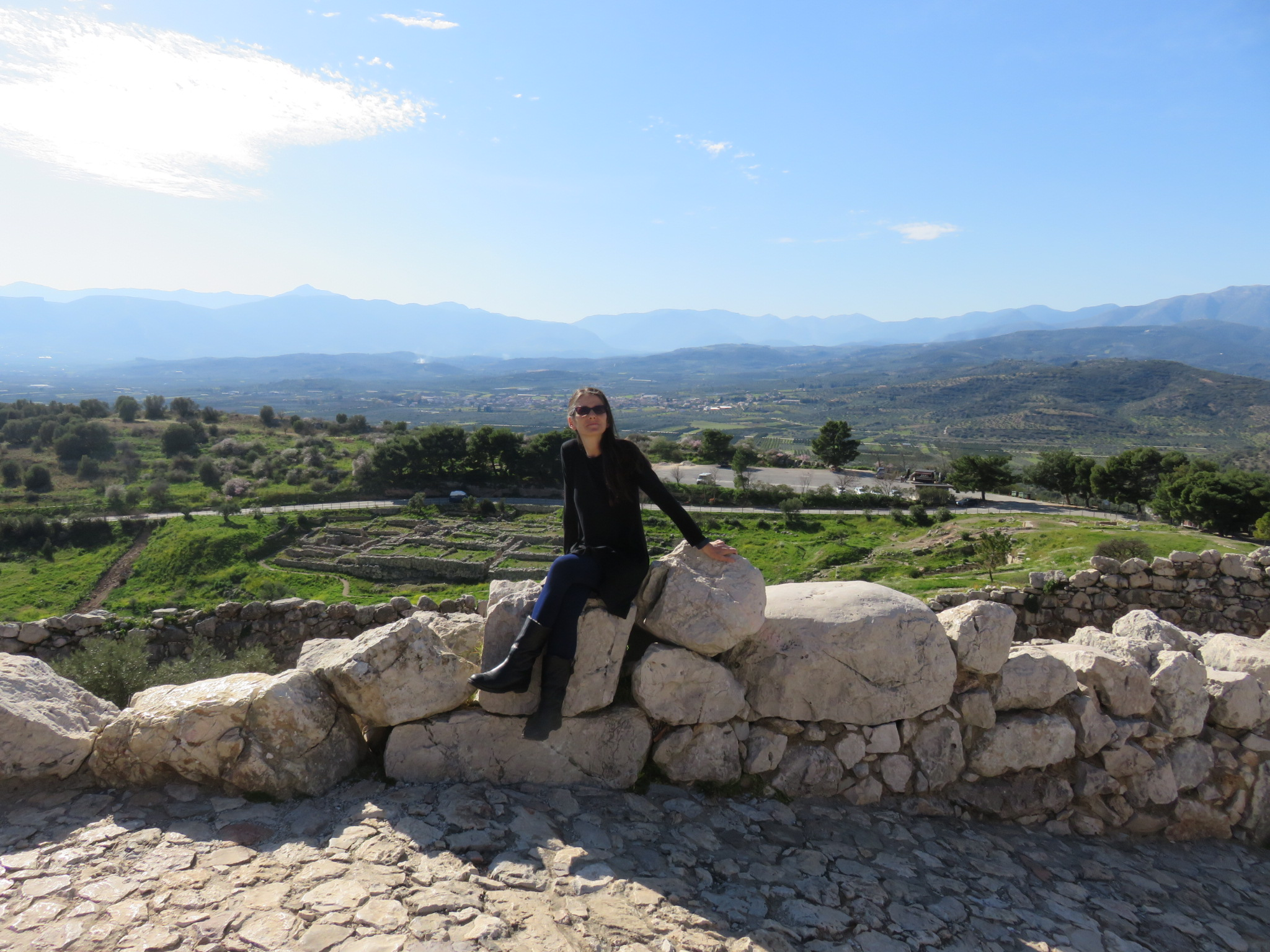

Jennifer Leigh Morse is a mathematician specializing in algebraic combinatorics. She is a professor of mathematics at the University of Virginia.

== Research ==
Morse's interests in algebraic combinatorics include representation theory and applications to statistical physics, symmetric functions, Young tableaux, and $k$-Schur functions, which are a generalization of Schur polynomials.

== Education and career ==
Morse earned her Ph.D. in 1999 from the University of California, San Diego. Her dissertation, Explicit Expansions for Knop-Sahi and Macdonald Polynomials, was supervised by Adriano Garsia.

She has been a faculty member at the University of Pennsylvania, at the University of Miami, and at Drexel University before moving to the University of Virginia in 2017.

== Book ==
Morse is one of six coauthors of the book $k$-Schur Functions and Affine Schubert Calculus (Fields Institute Monographs 33, Springer, 2014).

== Recognition ==
Morse was named a Simons Fellow in Mathematics in 2012 and again in 2021. She was elected as a Fellow of the American Mathematical Society in the 2021 class of fellows, "for contributions to algebraic combinatorics and representation theory and service to the mathematical community". She is an invited speaker at the 2026 International Congress of Mathematicians.
