= ZIP (file format) =

Family of archive file formats

- Filename extension: .zip, .zipx, .z01
- Internet media type: application/zip application/x-zip-compressed
- Uniform Type Identifier (UTI): com.pkware.zip-archive
- Magic number: none; PK\x03\x04; PK\x05\x06 (empty); PK\x07\x08 (spanned)
- Developed by: PKWARE, Inc.
- Initial release: 14 February 1989; 37 years ago
- Latest release: 6.3.10; 1 November 2022; 4 years ago
- Type of format: Data compression
- Extended to: JAR, .ipa, .apk (EAR, RAR (Java), WAR); Office Open XML; Open Packaging Conventions; OpenDocument; XPI; dotLottie
- Standard: APPNOTE from PKWARE; ISO/IEC 21320-1:2015 (a subset of ZIP file format 6.3.3)
- Open format?: Some variants

ZIP is an archive file format that supports lossless data compression. A ZIP file may contain one or more files or directories that may have been compressed. The ZIP file format permits a number of compression algorithms, though DEFLATE is the most common.

This format was originally created in 1989 and was first implemented in PKWARE, Inc.'s PKZIP utility, as a replacement for the previous ARC compression format by Thom Henderson. The ZIP format was then quickly supported by many software utilities other than PKZIP. The ZIP format is natively supported on major operating systems (e.g. Android, ChromeOS, iOS, Linux, macOS, and Windows). It is typically built into an operating system's file management application.

ZIP files generally use the file extensions .zip or .ZIP and the MIME media type application/zip. ZIP is used as a base file format by many programs, usually under a different name. When navigating a file system via a user interface, graphical icons representing ZIP files often appear as a document or other object prominently featuring a zipper.

== History ==
The .ZIP file format was designed by Phil Katz of PKWARE, Inc. and Gary Conway of Infinity Design Concepts. The format was created after Systems Enhancement Associates (SEA) filed a lawsuit against PKWARE claiming that the latter's archiving products, named PKARC, were derivatives of SEA's ARC archiving system. The name "zip" (meaning "move at high speed") was suggested by Katz's friend, Robert Mahoney. They wanted to imply that their product would be faster than ARC and other compression formats of the time. By distributing the zip file format within APPNOTE.TXT, compatibility with the zip file format proliferated widely on the public Internet during the 1990s.

PKWARE and Infinity Design Concepts made a joint press release on February 14, 1989, releasing the .ZIP file format into the public domain.

=== Version history ===
The .ZIP File Format Specification has its own version number, which does not necessarily correspond to the version numbers for the PKZIP tool, especially with PKZIP 6 or later. At various times, PKWARE has added preliminary features that allow PKZIP products to extract archives using advanced features, but PKZIP products that create such archives are not made available until the next major release. Other companies or organizations support the PKWARE specifications at their own pace.

The .ZIP file format specification is formally named "APPNOTE - .ZIP File Format Specification" and it is published on the PKWARE.com website since the late 1990s. Several versions of the specification were not published. Specifications of some features such as BZIP2 compression, strong encryption specification and others were published by PKWARE a few years after their creation. The URL of the online specification was changed several times on the PKWARE website.

A summary of key advances in various versions of the PKWARE software and/or specification:

- 2.0: (1993) File entries can be compressed with DEFLATE and use traditional PKWARE encryption (ZipCrypto).
- 2.1: (1996) Deflate64 compression support (claimed in APPNOTE 6.1.0 published much later). APPNOTE may not have been published for 2.1.
- 2.5: PKWARE DCL Implode compression. APPNOTE may not have been published for 2.5.
- 2.5: Deflate64 compression support (claimed in later user manuals, e.g. in 2004.)
- 4.0: (2000) Deflate64 compression support (according to information provided by Jim Peterson, Chief Scientist, PKWARE, to the Library of Congress; and APPNOTE 4.0).
- 4.5: (2001) Documented 64-bit zip format.
- 4.6: (2001) BZIP2 compression (not published online until the publication of APPNOTE 5.2)
- 5.0: (2002) SES: DES, Triple DES, RC2, RC4 supported for encryption (not published online until the publication of APPNOTE 5.2)
- 5.2: (2003) AES encryption support for SES (defined in APPNOTE 5.1 that was not published online) and AES from WinZip ("AE-x"); corrected version of RC2-64 supported for SES encryption.
- 6.1: (2004) Documented certificate storage.
- 6.2.0: (2004) Documented Central Directory Encryption.
- 6.3.0: (2006) Documented Unicode (UTF-8) filename storage. Expanded list of supported compression algorithms (LZMA, PPMd+), encryption algorithms (Blowfish, Twofish), and hashes.
- 6.3.1: (2007) Corrected standard hash values for SHA-256/384/512.
- 6.3.2: (2007) Documented compression method 97 (WavPack).
- 6.3.3: (2012) Document formatting changes to facilitate referencing the PKWARE Application Note from other standards using methods such as the JTC 1 Referencing Explanatory Report (RER) as directed by JTC 1/SC 34 N 1621.
- 6.3.4: (2014) Updates the PKWARE, Inc. office address.
- 6.3.5: (2018) Documented compression methods 16, 96 and 99, DOS timestamp epoch and precision, added extra fields for keys and decryption, as well as typos and clarifications.
- 6.3.6: (2019) Corrected typographical error.
- 6.3.7: (2020) Added Zstandard compression method ID 20.
- 6.3.8: (2020) Moved Zstandard compression method ID from 20 to 93, deprecating the former. Documented method IDs 94 and 95 (MP3 and XZ respectively).
- 6.3.9: (2020) Corrected a typo in Data Stream Alignment description.
- 6.3.10: (2022) Added several z/OS attribute values for APPENDIX B. Added several additional 3rd party Extra Field mappings.

WinZip, starting with version 12.1, uses the extension .zipx for ZIP files that use compression methods newer than DEFLATE; specifically, methods BZip, LZMA, PPMd, Jpeg and Wavpack. The last 2 are applied to appropriate file types when "Best method" compression is selected.

=== Standardization ===
In April 2010, ISO/IEC JTC 1 initiated a ballot to determine whether a project should be initiated to create an ISO/IEC International Standard format compatible with ZIP. The proposed project, entitled Document Packaging, envisaged a ZIP-compatible 'minimal compressed archive format' suitable for use with a number of existing standards including OpenDocument, Office Open XML and EPUB. It would solve problems such as the need for a formal standard, the variety of extensions of ZIP, the undesirability of a technology used for Open Standards potentially having proprietary extensions or "submarine" patents (i.e. which could surface unexpectedly), the need for better internationalization, and a desire not to actually fragment the technology further by purporting to provide an alternative specification to the PKWARE APPNOTE document.

In 2015, ISO/IEC 21320-1 "Document Container File — Part 1: Core" was published which states that "Document container files are conforming Zip files", normatively referencing the PKWARE APPNOTE document. It requires the following main restrictions of the ZIP file format:

- Files in ZIP archives may only be stored uncompressed, or using the "deflate" compression (i.e. compression method may contain the value "0" - stored or "8" - deflated). The patent on the core "deflate" compression method expired in late 2010.
- The encryption features are prohibited.
- The digital signature features (from SES) are prohibited.
- The "patched data" features (from PKPatchMaker) are prohibited.
- Archives may not span multiple volumes or be segmented.

== Design ==
.ZIP files are archives that store multiple files. ZIP allows contained files to be compressed using many different methods, as well as simply storing a file without compressing it. Each file is stored separately, allowing different files in the same archive to be compressed using different methods. Because the files in a ZIP archive are compressed individually, it is possible to extract them, or add new ones, without applying compression or decompression to the entire archive. This contrasts with the format of compressed tar files, for which such random-access processing is not easily possible.

A directory is placed at the end of a ZIP file. This identifies what files are in the ZIP and identifies where in the ZIP that file is located. This allows ZIP readers to load the list of files without reading the entire ZIP archive. ZIP archives can also include extra data that is not related to the ZIP archive. This allows for a ZIP archive to be made into a self-extracting archive (application that decompresses its contained data), by prepending the program code to a ZIP archive and marking the file as executable. Storing the catalog at the end also makes possible to hide a zipped file by appending it to an innocuous file, such as a GIF image file.

The .ZIP format uses CRC-32 and includes two copies of each entry metadata to provide greater protection against data loss. The CRC-32 algorithm was contributed by David Schwaderer and can be found in his book "C Programmers Guide to NetBIOS" published by Howard W. Sams & Co. Inc.

=== Structure ===
ZIP-64 Internal Layout

A ZIP file is correctly identified by the presence of an end of central directory record which is located at the end of the archive structure in order to allow the easy appending of new files. If the end of central directory record indicates a non-empty archive, the name of each file or directory within the archive should be specified in a central directory entry, along with other metadata about the entry, and an offset into the ZIP file, pointing to the actual entry data. This allows a file listing of the archive to be performed relatively quickly, as the entire archive does not have to be read to see the list of files. The entries within the ZIP file also include this information, for redundancy, in a local file header. Because ZIP files may be appended to, only files specified in the central directory at the end of the file are valid. Scanning a ZIP file for local file headers is invalid (except in the case of corrupted archives), as the central directory may declare that some files have been deleted and other files have been updated.

For example, we may start with a ZIP file that contains files A, B and C. File B is then deleted and C updated. This may be achieved by just appending a new file C to the end of the original ZIP file and adding a new central directory that only lists file A and the new file C. When ZIP was first designed, transferring files by floppy disk was common, yet writing to disks was very time-consuming. If you had a large zip file, possibly spanning multiple disks, and only needed to update a few files, rather than reading and re-writing all the files, it would be substantially faster to just read the old central directory, append the new files then append an updated central directory.

The order of the file entries in the central directory need not coincide with the order of file entries in the archive.

Each entry stored in a ZIP archive is introduced by a local file header with information about the file such as the comment, file size and file name, followed by optional "extra" data fields, and then the possibly compressed, possibly encrypted file data. The "Extra" data fields are the key to the extensibility of the ZIP format. "Extra" fields are exploited to support the ZIP64 format, WinZip-compatible AES encryption, file attributes, and higher-resolution NTFS or Unix file timestamps. Other extensions are possible via the "Extra" field. ZIP tools are required by the specification to ignore Extra fields they do not recognize.

The ZIP format uses specific 4-byte "signatures" to denote the various structures in the file. Each file entry is marked by a specific signature. The end of central directory record is indicated with its specific signature, and each entry in the central directory starts with the 4-byte central file header signature.

There is no BOF or EOF marker in the ZIP specification. Conventionally the first thing in a ZIP file is a ZIP entry, which can be identified easily by its local file header signature. However, this is not necessarily the case, as this is not required by the ZIP specification - most notably, a self-extracting archive will begin with an executable file header.

Tools that correctly read ZIP archives must scan for the end of central directory record signature, and then, as appropriate, the other, indicated, central directory records. They must not scan for entries from the top of the ZIP file, because (as previously mentioned in this section) only the central directory specifies where a file chunk starts and that it has not been deleted. Scanning could lead to false positives, as the format does not forbid other data to be between chunks, nor file data streams from containing such signatures. However, tools that attempt to recover data from damaged ZIP archives will most likely scan the archive for local file header signatures; this is made more difficult by the fact that the compressed size of a file chunk may be stored after the file chunk, making sequential processing difficult.

Most of the signatures end with the short integer 0x4b50, which is stored in little-endian ordering. Viewed as an ASCII string this reads "PK", the initials of the inventor Phil Katz. Thus, when a ZIP file is viewed in a text editor the first two bytes of the file are usually "PK". (DOS, OS/2 and Windows self-extracting ZIPs have an EXE before the ZIP so start with "MZ"; self-extracting ZIPs for other operating systems may similarly be preceded by executable code for extracting the archive's content on that platform.)

The .ZIP specification also supports spreading archives across multiple file-system files. Originally intended for storage of large ZIP files across multiple floppy disks, this feature is now used for sending ZIP archives in parts over email, or over other transports or removable media.

The FAT filesystem of DOS has a timestamp resolution of only two seconds; ZIP file records mimic this. As a result, the built-in timestamp resolution of files in a ZIP archive is only two seconds, though extra fields can be used to store more precise timestamps. The ZIP format has no notion of time zone, so timestamps are only meaningful if it is known what time zone they were created in.

In September 2006, PKWARE released a revision of the ZIP specification providing for the storage of file names using UTF-8, finally adding Unicode compatibility to ZIP.

=== File headers ===
All multi-byte values in the header are stored in little-endian byte order. All length fields count the length in bytes.

==== Local file header ====
Offset (bytes)	Size (bytes)	Description
0	4	Magic number – must be 50 4B 03 04
4	2	Version needed to extract (minimum)
6	2	General purpose bit flag
8	2	Compression method; e.g. none = 0, DEFLATE = 8 (or 08 00)
10	2	File last modification time
12	2	File last modification date
14	4	CRC-32 of uncompressed data
18	4	Compressed size (or FF FF FF FF for ZIP64)
22	4	Uncompressed size (or FF FF FF FF for ZIP64)
26	2	File name length (n)
28	2	Extra field length (m)
30	n	File name
30+n	m	Extra field

The extra field contains a variety of optional data such as OS-specific attributes. It is divided into records, each with at minimum a 16-bit signature and a 16-bit length. A ZIP64 local file extra field record, for example, has the signature 0x0001 and a length of 16 bytes (or more) so that two 64-bit values (the uncompressed and compressed sizes) may follow. Another common local file extension is 0x5455 (or "UT") which contains 32-bit UTC UNIX timestamps.

This is immediately followed by the compressed data.

==== Data descriptor ====
If the bit number 3 (0x08) of the general-purpose flags field is set, then the CRC-32 and file sizes are not known when the header is written. If the archive is in Zip64 format, the compressed and uncompressed size fields are 8 bytes long instead of 4 bytes long (see section 4.3.9.2). The equivalent fields in the local header (or in the Zip64 extended information extra field in the case of archives in Zip64 format) are filled with zero, and the CRC-32 and size are appended in a 12-byte structure (optionally preceded by a 4-byte signature) immediately after the compressed data:

Offset (bytes)	Size (bytes)	Description
0	0 or 4	Optional magic number. If present, must be 50 4B 07 08.
0 or 4	4	CRC-32 of uncompressed data.
4 or 8	4 or 8	Compressed size.
8 or 12 or 16	4 or 8	Uncompressed size.

==== Central directory file header (CDFH) ====
The central directory file header entry is an expanded form of the local header:

Offset (bytes)	Size (bytes)	Description
0	4	Magic number. Must be 50 4B 01 02.
4	2	Version made by.
6	2	Version needed to extract (minimum).
8	2	General purpose bit flag.
10	2	Compression method.
12	2	File last modification time.
14	2	File last modification date.
16	4	CRC-32 of uncompressed data.
20	4	Compressed size (or FF FF FF FF for ZIP64).
24	4	Uncompressed size (or FF FF FF FF for ZIP64).
28	2	File name length (n).
30	2	Extra field length (m).
32	2	File comment length (k).
34	2	Disk number where file starts (or FF FF for ZIP64).
36	2	Internal file attributes.
38	4	External file attributes.
42	4	Relative offset of local file header (or FF FF FF FF for ZIP64). This is the number of bytes between the start of the first disk on which the file occurs, and the start of the local file header. This allows software reading the central directory to locate the position of the file inside the ZIP file.
46	n	File name.
46+n	m	Extra field.
46+n+m	k	File comment.

==== End of central directory record (EOCD) ====
After all the central directory entries comes the end of central directory (EOCD) record, which marks the end of the ZIP file:

Offset (bytes)	Size (bytes)	Description
0	4	Magic number. Must be 50 4B 05 06.
4	2	Number of this disk (or FF FF for ZIP64).
6	2	Disk where central directory starts (or FF FF for ZIP64).
8	2	Number of central directory records on this disk (or FF FF for ZIP64).
10	2	Total number of central directory records (or FF FF for ZIP64).
12	4	Size of central directory in bytes (or FF FF FF FF for ZIP64).
16	4	Offset of start of central directory, relative to start of archive (or FF FF FF FF for ZIP64).
20	2	Comment length (n).
22	n	Comment.

This ordering allows a ZIP file to be created in one pass, but the central directory is also placed at the end of the file in order to facilitate easy removal of files from multiple-part (e.g. "multiple floppy-disk") archives, as previously discussed.

=== Compression methods ===
The .ZIP File Format Specification documents the following compression methods: Store (no compression), Shrink (LZW), Reduce (levels 1–4; LZ77 + probabilistic), Implode, Deflate, Deflate64, bzip2, LZMA, Zstandard, WavPack, PPMd, and a LZ77 variant provided by IBM z/OS CMPSC instruction. The most commonly used compression method is DEFLATE, which is described in IETF RFC 1951.

Other methods mentioned, but not documented in detail in the specification include: PKWARE DCL Implode (old IBM TERSE), new IBM TERSE, IBM LZ77 z Architecture (PFS), and a JPEG variant. A "Tokenize" method was reserved for a third party, but support was never added.

The word Implode is overused by PKWARE: the DCL/TERSE Implode is distinct from the old PKZIP Implode, a predecessor to Deflate. The DCL Implode is undocumented partially due to its proprietary nature held by IBM, but Mark Adler has nevertheless provided a decompressor called "blast" alongside zlib.

=== Encryption ===
ZIP supports a simple password-based symmetric encryption system generally known as ZipCrypto. It is documented in the ZIP specification, and known to be seriously flawed. In particular, it is vulnerable to known-plaintext attacks, which are in some cases made worse by poor implementations of random-number generators. Computers running under native Microsoft Windows without third-party archivers can open, but not create, ZIP files encrypted with ZipCrypto, but cannot extract the contents of files using different encryption.

New features including new compression and encryption (e.g. AES) methods have been documented in the ZIP File Format Specification since version 5.2. A WinZip-developed AES-based open standard ("AE-x" in APPNOTE) is used also by 7-Zip and Xceed, but some vendors use other formats. PKWARE SecureZIP (SES, proprietary) also supports RC2, RC4, DES, Triple DES encryption methods, Digital Certificate-based encryption and authentication (X.509), and archive header encryption. It is, however, patented (see § Strong encryption controversy).

File name encryption is introduced in .ZIP File Format Specification 6.2, which encrypts metadata stored in Central Directory portion of an archive, but Local Header sections remain unencrypted. A compliant archiver can falsify the Local Header data when using Central Directory Encryption. As of version 6.2 of the specification, the Compression Method and Compressed Size fields within Local Header are not yet masked.

=== ZIP64 ===
The original .ZIP format had a 4 GiB (2^{32} bytes) limit on various things (uncompressed size of a file, compressed size of a file, and total size of the archive), as well as a limit of 65,535 (2^{16} − 1) entries in a ZIP archive. In version 4.5 of the specification (which is not the same as v4.5 of any particular tool), PKWARE introduced the "ZIP64" format extensions to get around these limitations, increasing the limits to 16 EiB (2^{64} bytes). In essence, it uses a "normal" central directory entry for a file, followed by an optional "zip64" directory entry, which has the larger fields.

The format of the Local file header (LOC) and Central directory file header (CDFH) are the same in ZIP and ZIP64. However, ZIP64 specifies an extra field that may be added to those records at the discretion of the compressor, whose purpose is to store values that do not fit in the classic LOC or CDFH records. To signal that the actual values are stored in ZIP64 extra fields, they are set to 0xFFFF or 0xFFFFFFFF in the corresponding LOC or CDFH record. If one entry does not fit into the classic LOC or CDFH record, only that entry is required to be moved into a ZIP64 extra field. The other entries may stay in the classic record. Therefore, not all entries shown in the following table might be stored in a ZIP64 extra field. However, if they appear, their order must be as shown in the table.

Zip64 extended information extra field
Offset (bytes)	Size (bytes)	Description
0	2	Header ID 0x0001.
2	2	Size of the extra field chunk (8, 16, 24 or 28).
4	8	Original uncompressed file size.
12	8	Size of compressed data.
20	8	Offset of local header record.
28	4	Number of the disk on which this file starts.

On the other hand, the format of EOCD for ZIP64 is slightly different from the normal ZIP version.

Zip64 End of central directory record (EOCD64)
Offset (bytes)	Size (bytes)	Description
0	4	Magic number. Must be 50 4B 06 06.
4	8	Size of the EOCD64 minus 12.
12	2	Version made by.
14	2	Version needed to extract (minimum).
16	4	Number of this disk.
20	4	Disk where central directory starts.
24	8	Number of central directory records on this disk.
32	8	Total number of central directory records.
40	8	Size of central directory in bytes.
48	8	Offset of start of central directory, relative to start of archive.
56	n	Comment (up to the size of EOCD64).

The EOCD64 is not necessarily the last record in the file. It is followed by a 20 byte End of Central Directory Locator, and the classic EOCD record.

Zip64 End of Central Directory Locator
Offset (bytes)	Size (bytes)	Description
0	4	Magic number. Must be 50 4B 06 07.
4	4	Disk where EOCD64 starts.
8	8	Offset to start of EOCD64, relative to start of archive.
16	4	Total number of disks.

The File Explorer in Windows XP does not support ZIP64, but the Explorer in Windows Vista and later do. Likewise, some extension libraries support ZIP64, such as DotNetZip, QuaZIP and IO::Compress::Zip in Perl. Python's built-in zipfile supports it since 2.5 and defaults to it since 3.4. OpenJDK's built-in java.util.zip supports ZIP64 from version Java 7. Android Java API support ZIP64 since Android 6.0. Mac OS Sierra's Archive Utility notably does not support ZIP64, and can create corrupt archives when ZIP64 would be required. However, the ditto command shipped with Mac OS will unzip ZIP64 files. More recent versions of Mac OS ship with info-zip's zip and unzip command line tools which do support Zip64: to verify run zip -v and look for "ZIP64_SUPPORT".

=== Combination with other file formats ===
The .ZIP file format allows for a comment containing up to 65,535 (2^{16} − 1) bytes of data to occur at the end of the file after the central directory. Also, because the central directory specifies the offset of each file in the archive with respect to the start, it is possible for the first file entry to start at an offset other than zero, although some tools might not process archive files that do not start with a file entry at offset zero. The program gzip, for example, happens to be able to extract an entry from a .ZIP file if it is at offset zero.

This allows arbitrary data to occur in the file both before and after the ZIP archive data, and for the archive to still be read by a ZIP application. A side-effect of this is that it is possible to author a file that is both a working ZIP archive and another format, provided that the other format tolerates arbitrary data at its end, beginning, or middle. Self-extracting archives (SFX), of the form supported by WinZip, take advantage of this, in that they are executable (.exe) files that conform to the PKZIP AppNote.txt specification, and can be read by compliant zip tools or libraries.

This property of the .ZIP format, and of the JAR format which is a variant of ZIP, can be exploited to hide rogue content (such as harmful Java classes) inside a seemingly harmless file, such as a GIF image uploaded to the web. This so-called GIFAR exploit has been demonstrated as an effective attack against web applications such as Facebook.

=== Limits ===
The minimum size of a .ZIP file is 22 bytes. Such an empty zip file contains only an End of Central Directory Record (EOCD): 50 4B 05 06 00 00 00 00 00 00 00 00 00 00 00 00 00 00 00 00 00 00

The maximum size for both the archive file and the individual files inside it is 4,294,967,295 bytes (2^{32} − 1 bytes, or 4 GiB minus 1 byte) for standard ZIP. For ZIP64, the maximum size is 18,446,744,073,709,551,615 bytes (2^{64} − 1 bytes, or 16 EiB minus 1 byte).

=== Proprietary extensions ===
==== Extra field ====
.ZIP file format includes an extra field facility within file headers, which can be used to store extra data not defined by existing ZIP specifications, and which allow compliant archivers that do not recognize the fields to safely skip them. Header IDs 0–31 are reserved for use by PKWARE. The remaining IDs can be used by third-party vendors for proprietary usage.

==== Strong encryption controversy ====
When WinZip 9.0 public beta was released in 2003, WinZip introduced its own AES-256 encryption, using a different file format, along with the documentation for the new specification. The encryption standards themselves were not proprietary, but PKWARE had not updated APPNOTE.TXT to include Strong Encryption Specification (SES) since 2001, which had been used by PKZIP versions 5.0 and 6.0. WinZip technical consultant Kevin Kearney and StuffIt product manager Mathew Covington accused PKWARE of withholding SES, but PKZIP chief technology officer Jim Peterson claimed that certificate-based encryption was still incomplete.

In another controversial move, PKWare applied for a patent on 16 July 2003 describing a method for combining ZIP and strong encryption to create a secure file.

In the end, PKWARE and WinZip agreed to support each other's products. On 21 January 2004, PKWARE announced the support of WinZip-based AES compression format. In a later version of WinZip beta, it was able to support SES-based ZIP files. PKWARE eventually released version 5.2 of the .ZIP File Format Specification to the public, which documented SES. The Free Software project 7-Zip also supports AES, but not SES in ZIP files (as does its POSIX port p7zip).

When using AES encryption under WinZip, the compression method is always set to 99, with the actual compression method stored in an AES extra data field. In contrast, Strong Encryption Specification stores the compression method in the basic file header segment of Local Header and Central Directory, unless Central Directory Encryption is used to mask/encrypt metadata.

== Implementation ==
There are numerous .ZIP tools available, and numerous .ZIP libraries for various programming environments; licenses used include proprietary and free software. WinZip, WinRAR, Info-ZIP, ZipGenius, 7-Zip, PeaZip and B1 Free Archiver are well-known .ZIP tools, available on various platforms. Some of those tools have library or programmatic interfaces.

Some development libraries licensed under open source agreement are libzip, libarchive, and Info-ZIP. For Java: Java Platform, Standard Edition contains the package "java.util.zip" to handle standard .ZIP files; the Zip64File library specifically supports large files (larger than 4 GiB) and treats .ZIP files using random access; and the Apache Ant tool contains a more complete implementation released under the Apache Software License.

The Info-ZIP implementations of the .ZIP format adds support for Unix filesystem features, such as user and group IDs, file permissions, and support for symbolic links. The Apache Ant implementation is aware of these to the extent that it can create files with predefined Unix permissions. The Info-ZIP implementations also know how to use the error correction capabilities built into the .ZIP compression format. Some programs do not, and will fail on a file that has errors.

The Info-ZIP Windows tools also support NTFS filesystem permissions, and will make an attempt to translate from NTFS permissions to Unix permissions or vice versa when extracting files. This can result in potentially unintended combinations, e.g. .exe files being created on NTFS volumes with executable permission denied.

Versions of Microsoft Windows have included support for .ZIP compression in Explorer since the Microsoft Plus! pack was released for Windows 98. Microsoft calls this feature "Compressed Folders". Native support was added as of the year 2000 in Windows ME. Not all .ZIP features are supported by the Windows Compressed Folders capability. For example, encryption is not supported in Windows 10 Home edition, although it can decrypt. Unicode entry encoding is not supported until Windows 7, while split and spanned archives are not readable or writable by the Compressed Folders feature, nor is AES Encryption supported. Windows .zip support stemmed from an acquisition of "VisualZip" written by Dave Plummer.

Apple has included built-in ZIP support in Mac OS X 10.3 (via BOMArchiveHelper, now Archive Utility) and later. Most free operating systems have built in support for ZIP in similar manners to Windows and macOS.

OpenDocument Format (ODF) started using the zip archive format in 2005, ODF is an open format for office documents of all types, this is the default file format used in Collabora Online, LibreOffice and others. Microsoft Office started using the zip archive format in 2006 for their Office Open XML .docx, .xlsx, .pptx, etc. files, which became the default file format with Microsoft Office 2007.

=== Internationalization issues ===
Versions of the format prior to 6.3.0 did not support storing file names in Unicode. According to the standard, file names should be stored in the CP437 encoding, which is standard for the IBM PC, but in practice, DOS archivers used the system's installed character encoding. The built-in archiver of Windows up to 11 also used the system's "ANSI" encoding corresponding to the selected system language for backward compatibility with DOS when creating archives.

Subsequently, the standard was updated to include two options for storing file names in Unicode: 1) when the 11th bit in the General purpose bit flag field is set, the file name in the "File name" field of the header should be considered as UTF-8 rather than a single-byte encoding, and 2) the Unicode Path Extra Field was added to store the file name in UTF-8 encoding. The following algorithm accounts for both the new "file name" field and the historical practices to correctly extract files with names containing non-English characters:

1. Check for the presence of the Unicode Path Extra Field, and if it exists, use the filename from it, encoded in UTF-8.
2. Check for the presence of flag 11 in the General purpose bit flag field, and if it is set, consider the filename encoding in the "File name" field to be UTF-8.
3. If the "packing OS" field contains the value 11 (NTFS, Windows), and the "version of the packer" field value is greater than or equal to 20, consider the filename encoding in the "File name" field to be the ANSI (Windows) encoding corresponding to the system locale if one can be determined; otherwise, use CP437.
4. If the "packing OS" field contains the value 0 (FAT, DOS), and the "version of the packer" field value is between 25 and 40 inclusive, consider the filename encoding in the local header's "File name" field to be ANSI (Windows) encoding, and in the central header's "File name" field to be OEM (DOS) encoding, corresponding to the system locale if one can be determined; otherwise, use CP437.
5. In other cases, if the "OS packing" field contains the value 0 (FAT, DOS), 6 (HPFS, OS/2), or 11 (NTFS, Windows), consider the filename encoding in the "File name" field to be OEM (DOS) encoding, corresponding to the system locale if one can be determined; otherwise, use CP437.
6. In all other cases, consider the filename encoding in the "File name" field to be the system encoding of operating system the unpacker is running on.

If the wrong encoding is used to decode the file names, users end up seeing a chaotic set of characters, known as "mojibake", instead of letters of the national alphabet. The above algorithm tries its best to avoid such a result. Instead of the "system locale" and "system encoding", some programs let the user select the desired non-Unicode encoding.

In 2016, this problem was solved in the far2l file and archive manager for Linux, BSD and Mac. In 2024, similar solution was added to the version of 7zip used in the Debian distribution and its derivatives, and to the version of unzip used in the Ubuntu distribution and its derivatives.

== Legacy ==
There are numerous other standards and formats using "zip" as part of their name. For example, zip is distinct from gzip, and the latter is defined in IETF RFC 1952. Both zip and gzip primarily use the DEFLATE algorithm for compression. Likewise, the ZLIB format (IETF RFC 1950) also uses the DEFLATE compression algorithm, but specifies different headers for error and consistency checking. Other common, similarly named formats and programs with different native formats include 7-Zip, bzip2, and rzip.

== Concerns ==
The theoretical maximum compression factor for a raw DEFLATE stream is about 1032 to one, but by exploiting the ZIP format in unintended ways, ZIP archives with compression ratios of billions to one can be constructed. These zip bombs unzip to extremely large sizes, overwhelming the capacity of the computer they are decompressed on.

== See also ==
- Comparison of file archivers
- Comparison of archive formats
- List of archive formats
