= LBR (file format) =

The .LBR file format was an archive file format invented by Gary P. Novosielski used on CP/M and DOS operating systems during the early 1980s.

Packages in .LBR format were created by the LU program. It can act in interactive and parameter-driven mode, and can add, extract, delete files from the LBR package.

A companion program, still developed by Novosielski, is LRUN.COM: a small program which allows running a .COM (executable code) directly from any library, without having to extract it to a separate disk file.

Later compatible programs like NULU arrived for .LBR creation, and many tools such as LT and QL were capable of extracting from .LBR archives.

“LBR” is an abbreviation of Library, and, resembling the .tar file format, member files were only stored in the LBR file, not compressed. As transfer of LBR files by modem was common, it was typical practice for archiving a collection of files to compress them using the SQ or CRUNCH programs then store them in an .LBR archive, or else (more rarely) store the files in the LBR archive, then use SQ or CRUNCH to compress the archive.

A compressed LBR archive file was given the extension .LQR (if squeezed) or .LZR (if crunched); however, it was more common to compress the members of the archive than to compress the archive as a whole.

As MS-DOS and other operating systems became more popular and displaced CP/M, LBR's popularity waned.

The development of the ARC archiver which both compressed and archived files in one program went a long way towards displacing LBR on MS-DOS systems; on CP/M systems, LBR persisted longer due to the lack of a useful ARC port.
