= PKWare =

American software company

PKWARE, Inc
- Logo as of 2023
- Type: Private
- Industry: Data security; Computer software
- Founded: 1986; 40 years ago
- Founder: Phil Katz
- Headquarters: 201 E. Pittsburgh Ave., Ste. 400, Milwaukee, WI, U.S.
- Area served: Worldwide
- Key people: Spencer Kupferman (CEO), Tonya Cannady (CRO), Jason Dobbs (COO)
- Products: File encryption; Data discovery software; Data classification software; Data masking software; Data loss prevention software; Key management; Data compliance software; Data compression
- Brands: PK Protect; PK Masking; PK Privacy; PK Classification; PK Encryption; PK Discovery; SecureZip; PKZip
- Parent: Thompson Street Capital Partners (since 2020)
- Website: www.pkware.com

PKWARE, Inc. is an American enterprise data protection software company that provides discovery, classification, masking and encryption software, along with data compression software. The company is headquartered in Milwaukee, Wisconsin. PKWARE was founded in 1986 by Phil Katz, co-inventor of the ZIP standard. Thompson Street Capital Partners acquired PKWARE Inc. in 2020.

== History ==
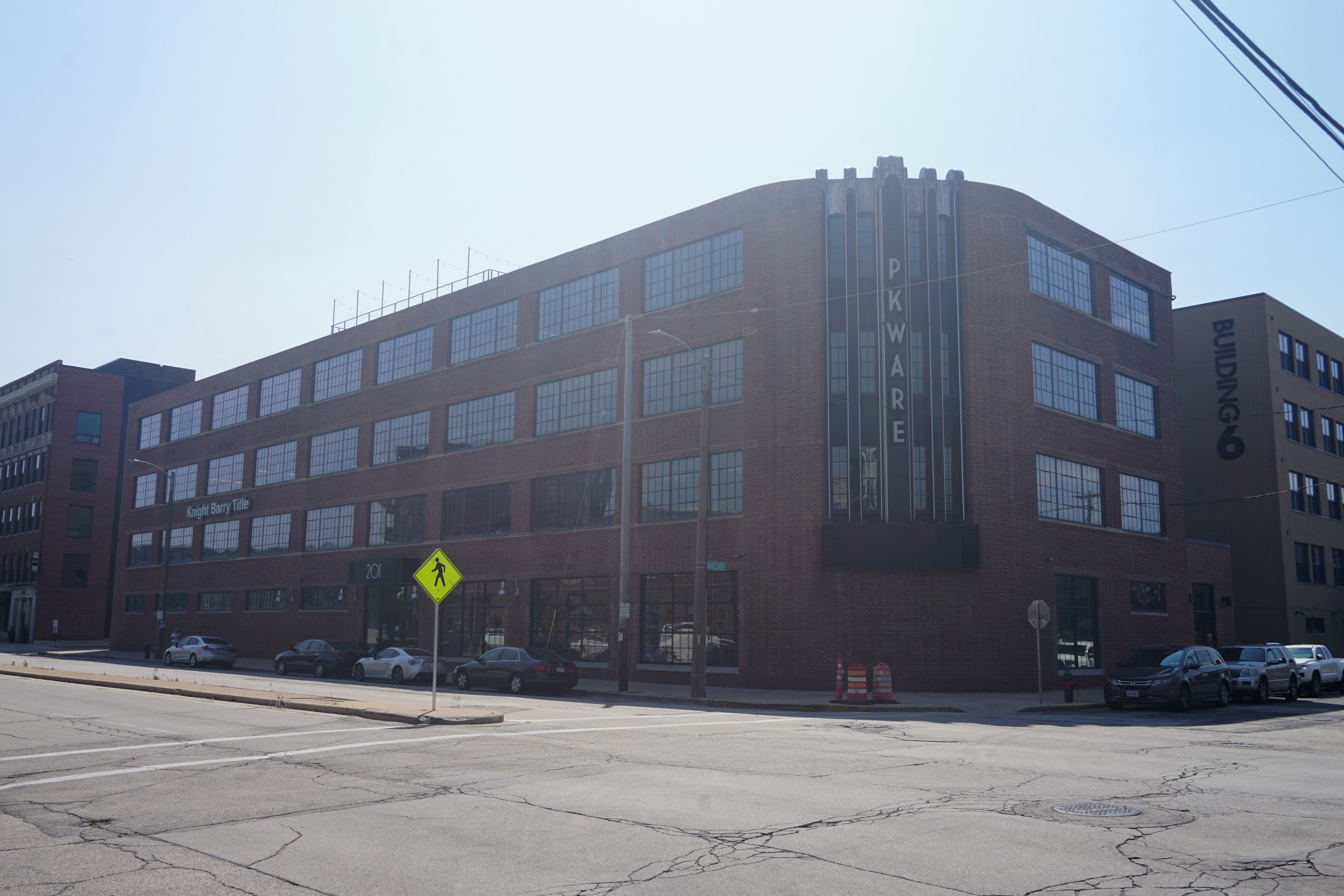
PKWare in Milwaukee, former Pittsburgh Plate Glass Enamel Plant

=== Compression software (1986–2000) ===
PKWARE was founded in 1986 by Phil Katz, a software developer who had begun distributing a new file compression utility, called PKARC, as shareware. PKARC represented a radical improvement over existing compression software (including the ARC utility, on which it was based) and gained popularity among individuals and corporations.

Following a legal settlement with Systems Enhancement Associates Inc., the owners of ARC, Katz stopped distributing PKARC. He released, as an open format, his own compression program, which he called PKZIP, in January 10, 1989. PKZIP was the first program to use the new ZIP file format, which Katz developed in conjunction with Gary Conway and subsequently released into the public domain.

PKWARE grew in its early years through business with large corporations. The ZIP format proved so popular that it became the de facto standard for data compression and remains in use throughout the world after more than 30 years.

=== Purchase and expansion (2001–2008) ===
After Katz died in 2000, his family sold the company to a new management team led by George Haddix and backed by investment-banking firm Grace Matthews. Two years later, the company acquired Ascent Solutions, a large-platform software firm based in Dayton, Ohio.

SecureZIP, a program that combined PKZIP's data compression with enhanced encryption functionality, was released in 2004. In the following years, PKWARE continued to add support for large and small platform operating systems and introduced new features for both PKZIP and SecureZIP.

=== Shift toward data protection (2009–2015) ===
A new ownership group including company management, Novacap Technologies, and Maranon Capital acquired PKWARE in 2009. The company's new CEO, V. Miller Newton, steered the company toward an increased focus on its encryption products in response to growing concerns about data security among PKWARE's customers in industries such as healthcare and government.

In 2012, PKWARE released Viivo, a cloud storage encryption product to help customers secure data stored on Dropbox and other cloud storage services. Viivo received attention for having been developed outside of traditional methods in an effort toward "disruptive innovation" in the emerging cloud security market.

=== Developing and purchasing expanded capabilities (2016–present) ===
PKWARE released Smartcrypt, a data protection platform combining encryption, data discovery, and encryption key management, in 2016. In 2018, PKWARE added Data Classification with Data Redaction to support PCI DSS compliance added one year later in 2019.

PKWARE was purchased by Thompson Street Capital Partners in May 2020. After acquiring Dataguise in November 2020, the companies were merged under the single PKWARE name. Products from both legacy companies were renamed according to the new PK branding structure and the combined company received new branding to support the changes. These expanded capabilities enable PKWARE to offer data protection for structured data, unstructured data and semi-structured data.

==== Acquisitions ====
On May 13, 2020, Thompson Street Capital Partners acquired PKWARE for an undisclosed sum. Under Thompson Street, PKWARE acquired Dataguise on November 10, 2020, for their sensitive information detection technologies ("data discovery").

== Products ==
In addition to its data compression and encryption products, PKWARE continues to maintain the ZIP file format standard in the public domain. The company publishes an Application Note on the ZIP file format, providing developers with a general description and technical details of the ZIP file storage specification. This Application Note ensures continued interoperability of the ZIP file format for all users.

Product name	Description
ZIP Reader	ZIP Reader is a free Windows utility. Any ZIP file can be opened with the reader program, regardless of where it was created. To open an archive, the user can drag and drop the desired zip file over the program, and it will extract. A second method is to simply select which file to extract from within the utility. An email address is required to download ZIP Reader from the PKWARE website.
PKZIP	PKZIP is a software utility that allows the compression and decompression of multiple files and folders into a single archive or multiple archives. The name combines the initials of company founder Phil Katz with “zip”, a reference to the software's speed. Originally, PKZIP was written as shareware for DOS. Since its creation, PKWARE has expanded support of PKZIP to Windows Desktop, Windows Server, UNIX, Linux, and IBM i and zSeries platforms. Later versions of PKZIP include strong encryption algorithms to accommodate security needs.
SecureZIP	SecureZIP was released in 2004 as an extension of PKZIP. SecureZIP contained the same compression and passphrase protection as PKZIP but also introduced digital signature authentication and digital certificate-based encryption. In 2006, the company added a new option called SecureZIP PartnerLink, through which customers can become "sponsors" and provide an unlimited number of SecureZIP Partner licenses to the organization's business partners. PKWARE added support for OpenPGP encryption in 2011, along with new features that allow SecureZIP to integrate with data loss prevention technology. In 2012, the company released mobile versions of SecureZIP for Android and iOS devices.
Viivo	Viivo, a cloud encryption service, was released in 2012. PKWARE made an end-of-life announcement for Viivo in 2017, with support continuing until July 1, 2018.
Smartcrypt	Launched in 2016, Smartcrypt became PKWARE's newest data protection tool, combining data discovery, encryption, and encryption key management. Smartcrypt includes a web-based management console, from which administrators can apply encryption policies across an organization's user devices and network resources.
PK Protect Suite	Rebranded in 2021 after the acquisition of Dataguise, the PK Protect suite encompasses all former PKWARE and Dataguise products and offers tools for managing personal data and other sensitive data through data discovery, classification, masking, redaction, and encryption. PK Protect includes the following product categories, which are offered to be purchased individually or as a bundle: PK Discovery – finds sensitive data wherever it lives in the enterprise; PK Classification – categorizes data for tagging and reporting; PK Masking – irreversible data protection that is auditable; PK Encryption – file encryption for data protection and analytics; PK Privacy – manages data retention policies and responds to DSAR

== Patents ==
Phil Katz was granted a patent in September 1991, for the search functions used in the PKZIP compression process.

In 2001 and 2005, PKWARE was awarded patents for patching technology used within PKZIP products. Also in 2005, PKWARE was granted a patent for methods used to manage .ZIP files within the Windows file manager and Outlook.

In total, PKWARE holds four patents, has over fourteen pending patents and, as of May 2020, is referenced in over two hundred patents.

== Awards ==
2002

- PKWARE was awarded PC Magazine's Editors' Choice for data compression software.

2016

- PKWARE Smartcrypt was awarded Security Products' GOVIES Government Security Awards for Encryption

2020

- PKWARE was awarded the gold 2020 Cybersecurity Excellence Award for Data Redaction and the bronze 2020 Award for Data Redaction

2021

- PKWARE was awarded the gold 2021 Cybersecurity Excellence Award for Database Security, the silver Award for Compliance Solution and the Silver Award for Data-Centric Security
- PKWARE was awarded the American Business Awards Gold Stevie® for Governance, Risk & Compliance Solution, and the American Business Awards Gold Stevie® for International Data Protection Solution

== See also ==
- Phil Katz
- PKLite
