= Phil Katz =

American software developer (1962–2000)

Phillip Walter Katz
- Born: November 3, 1962; Milwaukee, Wisconsin, U.S.
- Died: April 14, 2000 (aged 37); Milwaukee, Wisconsin, U.S.
- Occupation: Computer programmer
- Known for: Co-creator of Zip file format PKZIP

Phillip Walter Katz (November 3, 1962 – April 14, 2000) was a computer programmer best known as the co-creator of the ZIP file format for data compression, and the author of PKZIP, a program for creating zip files that ran under DOS.

A copyright lawsuit between System Enhancement Associates (SEA) and Katz's company, PKWARE, Inc., was widely publicized in the BBS community in the late 1980s. Katz's software business was very successful, but he struggled with social isolation and chronic alcoholism in the last years of his life.

== Education and career ==
Phil Katz was a graduate of Nicolet High School in Glendale, Wisconsin. He graduated from the Computer Science Engineering program at the University of Wisconsin–Milwaukee. After his graduation, he was hired by the Allen-Bradley company as a programmer. He wrote code to run programmable logic controllers, which operated manufacturing equipment on shop floors worldwide for Allen-Bradley's customers.

=== PKARC and PKWARE ===
Katz left Allen-Bradley in 1986 to work for Graysoft, a Milwaukee-based software company. At the time, he had worked on an alternative to Thom Henderson's ARC, named PKARC. ARC was written in C, with the source code available on System Enhancement Associates' bulletin board system (BBS). PKARC, written partially in assembly language, was much faster. Katz had a special flair for optimizing code: besides writing critical code in assembly language, he would write C code to perform the same task in several different ways and then examine the compiler output to see which produced the most efficient assembly code. He first publicly released only PKXARC, an extraction program, as freeware. Its much greater speed caused it to spread very quickly throughout the BBS community. Strong positive feedback and encouragement prompted Katz to release his compression program, PKARC, and eventually to make his software shareware. He founded PKWARE, Inc. (Phil Katz Software) in 1986, with the company's operations located in his home in Glendale, Wisconsin, but he remained at Graysoft until 1987. Steve Burg, a former Graysoft programmer, joined PKWARE in 1988.

=== PKZIP ===
PKZIP made Katz one of the most well-known shareware authors of all time. Although PKWARE became a multimillion-dollar company, Katz was more noted for his technical expertise than business prowess. His family assisted him in running the company, but he eventually fired them when they denied him access to the company's profits.

Katz was adamantly opposed to Microsoft Windows in the early 1990s. This led to PKWARE missing out on the opportunity to be the first to bring PKZIP to the platform, with WinZip becoming the standard tool on the platform instead.

== Lawsuits ==
In the late 1980s, a dispute arose between System Enhancement Associates (SEA), maker of the ARC program, and PKWARE. SEA sued Katz for trademark and copyright infringement. The most substantial evidence at trial was from an independent software expert, John Navas, who was appointed by the court to compare the two programs. He stated that PKARC was a derivative work of ARC, pointing out that comments in both programs were often identical, including spelling errors.

On August 2, 1988, the plaintiff and defendants announced a settlement of the lawsuit, which included a confidential cross-license agreement. Under the agreement, SEA licensed PKWARE for all the ARC-compatible programs published by PKWARE during the period beginning with the first release of PKXARC in late 1985 through July 31, 1988, in return for an undisclosed payment. PKWARE agreed to pay SEA to obtain a license that allowed the distribution of PKWARE's ARC-compatible programs until January 31, 1989, after which PKWARE would not license, publish or distribute any ARC compatible programs or utilities that process ARC compatible files. In exchange, PKWARE licensed SEA to use its source code for PKWARE's ARC-compatible programs. PKWARE also agreed to cease any use of SEA's trademark "ARC" and to change the names or marks used with PKWARE's programs to non-confusing designations. The remaining details of the agreement were sealed. In reaching the settlement, the defendants did not admit any fault or wrongdoing. The Wisconsin court order showed the defendants were ordered to pay damages to the plaintiff for the defendants' acts. Namely, the defendants were found to be infringing the plaintiff's copyrights, infringing trademark, as well as performing acts of unfair trade practices and unfair competition.

The leaked agreement document revealed that under the settlement terms, the defendants had paid the plaintiff $22,500 for past royalty payments and $40,000 for expense reimbursements. In addition, the defendants would pay the plaintiff a royalty fee of 6.5% of all revenue received for ARC compatible programs on all orders received after the effective date of the agreement. Such revenue would include any license fees or shareware registrations, received after the expiration of the license, for ARC compatible programs. In exchange, the plaintiff would also pay a commission in the amount of 6.5% of any license fees received by the plaintiff from any licensee referred to the plaintiff by the defendants, whether before or after the license termination date.

After the lawsuit, PKWARE released one last version of its PKARC and PKXARC utilities under the new names "PKPAK" and "PKUNPAK", and from then on concentrated on developing the separate programs PKZIP and PKUNZIP, which were based on new and different file compression techniques. However, following the renaming, SEA filed a lawsuit against PKWARE for contempt, for continually using the plaintiff's protected mark "ARC" by turning ARC from noun into verb in the PKPAK manual. The United States district court of the East District of Wisconsin ruled SEA's motion was denied, and the defendant was entitled to recover the legal cost of $500.

The SEA vs. PKWARE dispute quickly expanded into one of the largest controversies the BBS world had ever seen. The suit by SEA angered many shareware users who perceived that SEA was a "large, faceless corporation" and Katz was "the little guy". In fact, at the time, both SEA and PKWARE were small home-based companies. However, the community largely sided with Katz, because SEA was attempting to retroactively declare the ARC file format to be closed and proprietary. Katz received positive publicity by releasing the APPNOTE.TXT specification, documenting the Zip file format, and declaring that the Zip file format would always be free for competing software to implement. The net result was that the ARC format quickly dropped out of common use as the predominant compression format that bulletin board systems used for their file archives, and after a brief period of competing formats, the Zip format was adopted as the predominant standard.

== Alcoholism and death ==
Katz battled alcoholism for years. The earliest known arrest occurred in 1991. About a year later, Katz was again convicted of drunk driving. Between 1994 and September 1999, Katz was arrested five times for operating after suspension or revocation of his driver's license.

Before his death, Ozaukee County Sheriff's Department had several outstanding warrants against Katz, including jumping bail and the charges of operating an automobile while intoxicated and operating after revocation.

On April 14, 2000, at the age of 37, Katz was found dead in a hotel room with an empty bottle of peppermint schnapps in his hand. A coroner's report stated his death was a result of acute pancreatic bleeding caused by chronic alcoholism.

== See also ==
- List of deaths through alcohol
- PKLite
