= Michelle L. Wachs =

American mathematician

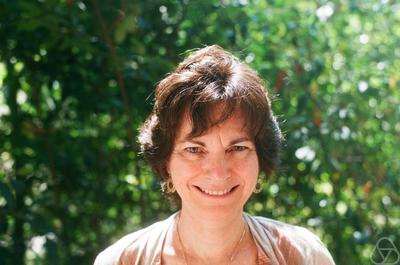
Berkeley, 2013

Michelle Lynn Wachs is an American mathematician who specializes in algebraic combinatorics and works as a professor of mathematics at the University of Miami.

== Contributions ==
Wachs and her advisor Adriano Garsia are the namesakes of the Garsia–Wachs algorithm for optimal binary search trees, which they published in 1977.^{[A]} She is also known for her research on shellings for simplicial complexes,^{[F]} partially ordered sets,^{[C]} and Coxeter groups,^{[B]} and on random permutation statistics^{[E]} and set partition statistics.^{[D]}

== Education ==
Wachs earned her doctorate in 1977 from the University of California, San Diego, under the supervision of Adriano Garsia. Her dissertation was Discrete Variational Techniques in Finite Mathematics.

== Recognition ==
In 2012 Wachs became one of the inaugural fellows of the American Mathematical Society. In 2013 she and her husband, mathematician Gregory Galloway (the chair of the mathematics department at Miami) were recognized as Simons Fellows. A conference in her honor was held in January 2015 at the University of Miami.

== Selected publications ==
A.	Garsia, Adriano M.; Wachs, Michelle L. (1977), "A new algorithm for minimum cost binary trees", SIAM Journal on Computing, 6 (4): 622–642, doi:10.1137/0206045, MR 0520738

B.	Björner, Anders; Wachs, Michelle (1982), "Bruhat order of Coxeter groups and shellability", Advances in Mathematics, 43 (1): 87–100, doi:10.1016/0001-8708(82)90029-9, MR 0644668

C.	Björner, Anders; Wachs, Michelle (1983), "On lexicographically shellable posets", Transactions of the American Mathematical Society, 277 (1): 323–341, doi:10.2307/1999359, JSTOR 1999359, MR 0690055

D.	Wachs, Michelle; White, Dennis (1991), "$p,q$-Stirling numbers and set partition statistics", Journal of Combinatorial Theory, Series A, 56 (1): 27–46, doi:10.1016/0097-3165(91)90020-H, MR 1082841

E.	Björner, Anders; Wachs, Michelle L. (1991), "Permutation statistics and linear extensions of posets", Journal of Combinatorial Theory, Series A, 58 (1): 85–114, doi:10.1016/0097-3165(91)90075-R, MR 1119703

F.	Björner, Anders; Wachs, Michelle L. (1996), "Shellable nonpure complexes and posets I", Transactions of the American Mathematical Society, 348 (4): 1299–1327, doi:10.1090/S0002-9947-96-01534-6, MR 1333388; Part II, Trans. AMS 349 (10): 3945–3975, 1997, doi:10.1090/S0002-9947-97-01838-2, MR 1401765
