= Adriano Garsia =

Mathematician

- Born: 20 August 1928; Tunis, French Tunisia
- Died: 6 October 2024 (aged 96)
- Education: Stanford University
- Scientific career
- Fields: Mathematics
- Workplaces: University of California, San Diego
- Doctoral advisor: Charles Loewner
- Doctoral students: Hélène Barcelo; Nantel Bergeron; Sara Billey; Stephen Milne; Jennifer Morse; Michelle L. Wachs

Adriano Mario Garsia (20 August 1928 – 6 October 2024) was a Tunisian-born Italian American mathematician who worked in analysis, combinatorics, representation theory, and algebraic geometry. He was a student of Charles Loewner and published work on representation theory, symmetric functions, and algebraic combinatorics. He and Mark Haiman made the n! conjecture. He is also the namesake of the Garsia–Wachs algorithm for optimal binary search trees, which he published with his student Michelle L. Wachs in 1977.

== Life ==
Born to Italian Tunisians in Tunis on 20 August 1928, Garsia moved to Rome in 1946.

As of 2023, he had 36 students and at least 200 descendants, according to the data at the Mathematics Genealogy Project. He was on the faculty of the University of California, San Diego. He retired in 2013 after 57 years at UCSD as a founding member of the Mathematics Department. At his 90 Birthday Conference in 2019, it was notable that he was the oldest principal investigator of a grant from the National Science Foundation in the country.

In 2012, he became a fellow of the American Mathematical Society.

== Books by A. Garsia ==
- Adriano M. Garsia, Topics in Almost Everywhere Convergence, Lectures in Advanced Mathematics Volume 4, Markham Publishing Co., Chicago, Ill., 1970. MR 0261253
- Adriano M. Garsia, Martingale inequalities: Seminar Notes on Recent Progress, Mathematics Lecture Notes Series, W. A. Benjamin, Inc., Reading, Mass.-London-Amsterdam, 1973. MR 0448538
- Adriano M. Garsia and Mark Haiman, Orbit Harmonics and Graded Representations, Research Monograph, to appear as part of the collection published by the Laboratoire de Combinatoire et d'Informatique Mathématique, edited by S. Brlek, Université du Québec à Montréal.
- Adriano M. Garsia and Ömer Eğecioğlu, Lessons in Enumerative Combinatorics, Graduate Texts in Mathematics 290, Springer Nature, Switzerland AG, 2021. ISBN 978-3-030-71249-5. MR 4268536
