= PKZIP =

File archiving software

- PKZIP 2.04g for DOS, circa 1993
- Original author: Phil Katz
- Developer: PKWARE, Inc.
- Type: archiving and data compression tool
- License: proprietary
- Website: https://www.pkware.com/

PKZIP is a file archiving computer program, notable for introducing the popular ZIP file format. PKZIP was first introduced for MS-DOS on the IBM-PC compatible platform in 1989. Since then versions have been released for a number of other architectures and operating systems. PKZIP was originally written by Phil Katz and marketed by his company PKWARE, Inc. starting in 1986. The company bears his initials: "PK".

== History ==
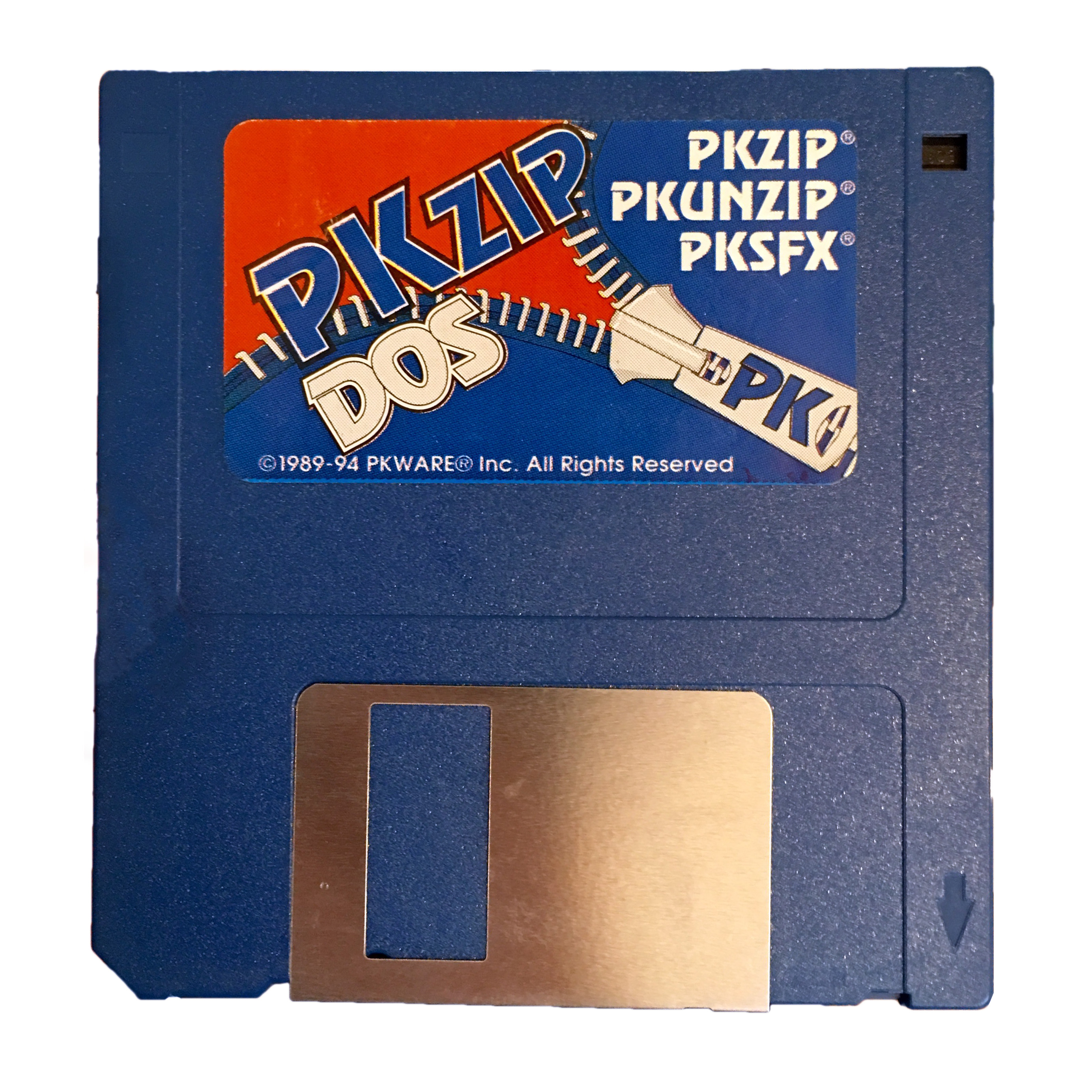
PKZIP on a floppy disk

By the 1970s, file archiving programs were distributed as standard utilities with operating systems. They include the Unix utilities ar, shar, and tar. These utilities were designed to gather a number of separate files into a single archive file for easier copying and distribution. These archives could optionally be passed through a stream compressor utility, such as compress and others.

Other archivers also appeared during the 1980s, including ARC by System Enhancement Associates, Inc. (SEA), Rahul Dhesi's ZOO, Dean W. Cooper's DWC, LHarc by Haruhiko Okomura and Haruyasu Yoshizaki and ARJ which stands for "Archived by Robert Jung".

In the mid-1980s Phil Katz developed a compression/archiving program called PKARC that was fully compatible with files created by ARC by System Enhancement Associates, Inc. (SEA). In addition, PKARC was written entirely in assembly language, making it much faster that the version made by SEA, and it also compressed files smaller, which was a big deal back in the days when floppy disks were used for file storage. As a result, PKARC quickly became a very popular program.

A lawsuit was filed by SEA claiming trademark infringement, so Katz changed the name to PKPAK, but SEA also claimed that Katz had copied source code from SEA's ARC program. Katz eventually settled the lawsuit and abandoned development of PKARC/PKPAK.

The development of PKZIP was first announced in the file SOFTDEV.DOC from within the PKPAK 3.61 package, stating it would develop a new and yet unnamed compression program. The announcement had been made following the lawsuit between SEA and PKWARE, Inc.. Although SEA won the suit, it lost the compression war, as the user base migrated to PKZIP as the compressor of choice. Led by some BBS sysops who refused to accept or offer files compressed as .ARC files, users began recompressing any old archives that were currently stored in .ARC format into .ZIP files.

The first version was released in 1989, as a DOS command-line tool, distributed under shareware model with a US$25 registration fee (US$47 with manual).

== .ZIP file format ==
To help ensure the interoperability of the ZIP format, Phil Katz published the original .ZIP File Format Specification in the APPNOTE.TXT documentation file. PKWARE continued to maintain this document and periodically published updates. Originally only bundled with registered versions of PKZIP, it was later available on the PKWARE site.

The specification has its own version number, which does not necessarily correspond to the PKZIP version numbers, especially with PKZIP 6 or later. At various times, PKWARE adds preliminary features that allows PKZIP products to extract archives using advanced features, but PKZIP products that create such archives won't be available until the next major release.

== Compatibility ==
Although popular at the time, ZIP archives using PKZIP 1.0 compression methods are now rare, and many unzip tools such as 7-Zip are able to read and write several other archive formats.

== Patents ==
Shrinking uses dynamic LZW, on which Unisys held patents. A patent for the Reduce Algorithm had also been filed on June 19, 1984, long before PKZIP was produced.

== See also ==
- Comparison of file archivers
- List of archive formats
- PKLite
