= Lowenstein (surname) =

Lowenstein or Loewenstein (German: Löwenstein) is a German-language and Yiddish-language surname meaning "lion stone". A dialect form of the name is Lewenstein, which is also the original Yiddish form. Other variants are Levenstein and Levenshtein.

Notable people with the name include:

== Loewenstein ==
- Alfred Loewenstein (1877–1928), Belgian financier, remembered for his mysterious disappearance and death
- Antony Loewenstein (born 1974), Australian political activist and journalist
- George Loewenstein (born 1955), American educator and economist
- Jason Loewenstein (born 1971), American rock musician and a member of the indie-rock band Sebadoh
- Karl Loewenstein (1891–1973), German-American professor of government and law
- Karl Loewenstein (banker) (1887–1975/1976), German banker and naval officer
- Meir David Loewenstein (1904–1995), Israeli politician
- Regina Loewenstein (1916–1999), American public health statistician
- Rudolph Loewenstein (psychoanalyst) (1898–1976), American psychoanalyst
- Rupert Loewenstein (1933–2014), Spanish-born Bavarian aristocrat and financial manager of The Rolling Stones

== Lowenstein ==
=== Arts and entertainment ===
- Jaron Lowenstein (born 1974), American singer
- Jon Lowenstein (born 1970), American documentary photographer, filmmaker, and visual artist
- Maria Lowenstein (1894–1982), American artist
- Richard Lowenstein (born 1959), Australian film director

=== Government and law ===
- Allard K. Lowenstein (1929–1980), American Democratic politician in New York state; father of Frank Lowenstein
- Daniel H. Lowenstein (attorney) (born 1943), American expert in election law
- Frank Lowenstein (born 1967), American lawyer, diplomat and former government official
- James Lowenstein (1927–2023), American diplomat
- Louis Lowenstein (lawyer) (1925–2009), American corporate attorney, law professor, and financial industry critic

=== Journalism ===
- Doug Lowenstein, American business executive and former newspaper reporter
- Ralph Lowenstein (1930–2020), American professor of journalism
- Roger Lowenstein (born 1954), American financial journalist

=== Medicine ===
- Daniel H. Lowenstein (physician), American neurologist
- Jerome Lowenstein (1933–2025), American medical doctor specializing in nephrology
- Leah Lowenstein (1930–1984), American nephrologist
- Louis Lowenstein (medicine) (1908–1968), American-born Canadian medical researcher
- Otto Lowenstein (1889–1965), German-American neuropsychiatrist

=== Sports ===
- Claude Lowenstein (1921–2010), French Olympic rower (coxswain)
- John Lowenstein (born 1947), American baseball player

=== Other ===
- Edward Lowenstein (1913–1970), American architect
- Nitza Lowenstein (born 1953), Israeli-Australian radio broadcaster and producer
- Otto Egon Lowenstein (1906–1999), German-born zoologist
- Solomon Lowenstein (1877–1942), American rabbi, social worker, and philanthropist
- Tom Lowenstein (1941–2025), English poet, ethnographer, teacher, and cultural historian
- Wendy Lowenstein (1927–2006), Australian historian, author, and teacher; mother of Richard Lowenstein

== Löwenstein ==
See also Löwenstein-Wertheim for a list of title holders in the House of Löwenstein-Wertheim

- Anna Löwenstein (born 1951), British journalist, teacher and activist in the Esperanto movement
- Baruch Solomon Löwenstein (19th century), Jewish mathematician
- Hans Louis Ferdinand von Löwenstein zu Löwenstein (1874–1959), German mining official, politician and Reichstag deputy
- Hans Otto Löwenstein (1881–1931), Austrian film director and screenwriter
- Heinz Bernhard Löwenstein (1923–1994), British actor and director best known as Heinz Bernard; father of Anna Löwenstein
- Hubertus, Prince of Löwenstein-Wertheim-Freudenberg (1906–1984), German historian and political figure
- Jakob Löwenstein (1799–1869), German rabbi and writer
- Jürgen Löwenstein (1925–2018), German-born Israeli citizen and concentration camp survivor
- Kurt Löwenstein (1885–1939, German politician
- László Löwenstein (1904–1964), birth name of Hungarian and American actor Peter Lorre
- Leo Löwenstein (1966–2010), German prince and endurance race driver
- Lippmann Hirsch Löwenstein (1809–1848), German Hebrew scholar
- Rudolf Löwenstein (1819–1891), German author

== Fictional characters ==
- Susan Lowenstein, a fictional character in the novel and film The Prince of Tides
- Margravine di Chiave Lowenstein, a fictional character in the 1963 Thomas Pynchon novel V.

== See also ==
- Lowenstein (disambiguation)
- Levenstein
- Lewenstein
- Lovenstein
