= Louis Lowenstein =

Louis Lowenstein may refer to:

- Louis Lowenstein (lawyer) (1925–2009), American corporate attorney, law professor, and financial industry critic
- Louis Lowenstein (medicine) (1908–1968), American-Canadian medical researcher who made significant contributions in hematology and immunology

== See also ==
- Lowenstein (surname)
