= Daniel Lowenstein =

Daniel Lowenstein may refer to:

- Daniel H. Lowenstein (attorney) (born 1943), American expert in election law
- Daniel H. Lowenstein (physician), American neurologist

== See also ==
- Lowenstein (surname)
