= Elias coding =

Elias coding is a term used for one of two types of lossless coding schemes used in digital communications:

- Shannon–Fano–Elias coding, a precursor to arithmetic coding, in which probabilities are used to determine codewords
- Universal coding using one of Elias' three universal codes, each with predetermined codewords:
  - Elias delta coding
  - Elias gamma coding
  - Elias omega coding
