= Scheuer =

Scheuer (German: Scheuer "barn, granary", a topographic name for someone who lived near a conspicuous barn or near a tithe-barn) is a surname. Notable people with the name include:

- Andreas Scheuer (born 1974), German politician
- Babe Scheuer (1913–1997), American football player
- Benjamin Scheuer, American songwriter
- David "Tebele" Scheuer (1712–1782), German rabbi
  - Mechel Scheuer (1739–1810), German rabbi, son of David Tebele Scheuer
  - Abraham Naftali-Hertz Scheuer (1755–1812), German rabbi, son of David Tebele Scheuer
- James H. Scheuer (1920–2005), New York politician
- Jens Scheuer (born 1978), German football manager
- Manfred Scheuer (born 1955), Austrian Roman Catholic bishop
- Max Scheuer, Austrian footballer
- Michael Scheuer (born 1952), American former intelligence officer for the CIA
- Michel Scheuer (1927–2015), West German sprint canoeist
- Norbert Scheuer (born 1951), German writer
- Philip K. Scheuer (1902–1985), American film critic
- Raymond J. Scheuer (1887–1939), American politician and businessman
- Sandra Scheuer (1949–1970), victim of the Kent State shootings
- Steven H. Scheuer (1926–2014), film- and television historian and -critic
- Sven Scheuer (born 1971), German footballer
- Tine Scheuer-Larsen (born 1966), Danish tennis player
