= Exponential-Golomb coding =

Type of universal code in data compression

An exponential-Golomb code (or just Exp-Golomb code) is a type of universal code. To encode any nonnegative integer x using the exp-Golomb code:

1. Write down x+1 in binary
2. Count the bits written, subtract one, and write that number of starting zero bits preceding the previous bit string.

The first few values of the code are:

 0 ⇒ 1 ⇒ 1
 1 ⇒ 10 ⇒ 010
 2 ⇒ 11 ⇒ 011
 3 ⇒ 100 ⇒ 00100
 4 ⇒ 101 ⇒ 00101
 5 ⇒ 110 ⇒ 00110
 6 ⇒ 111 ⇒ 00111
 7 ⇒ 1000 ⇒ 0001000
 8 ⇒ 1001 ⇒ 0001001
...[1]

In the above examples, consider the case 3. For 3, x+1 = 3 + 1 = 4. 4 in binary is '100'. '100' has 3 bits, and 3-1 = 2. Hence add 2 zeros before '100', which is '00100'

Similarly, consider 8. '8 + 1' in binary is '1001'. '1001' has 4 bits, and 4-1 is 3. Hence add 3 zeros before 1001, which is '0001001'.

This is identical to the Elias gamma code of x+1, allowing it to encode 0.

== Extension to negative numbers ==
Exp-Golomb coding is used in the H.264/MPEG-4 AVC and H.265 High Efficiency Video Coding video compression standards, in which there is also a variation for the coding of signed numbers by assigning the value 0 to the binary codeword '0' and assigning subsequent codewords to input values of increasing magnitude (and alternating sign, if the field can contain a negative number):

 0 ⇒ 0 ⇒ 1 ⇒ 1
 1 ⇒ 1 ⇒ 10 ⇒ 010
−1 ⇒ 2 ⇒ 11 ⇒ 011
 2 ⇒ 3 ⇒ 100 ⇒ 00100
−2 ⇒ 4 ⇒ 101 ⇒ 00101
 3 ⇒ 5 ⇒ 110 ⇒ 00110
−3 ⇒ 6 ⇒ 111 ⇒ 00111
 4 ⇒ 7 ⇒ 1000 ⇒ 0001000
−4 ⇒ 8 ⇒ 1001 ⇒ 0001001
...[1]

In other words, a non-positive integer x≤0 is mapped to an even integer −2x, while a positive integer x>0 is mapped to an odd integer 2x−1.

Exp-Golomb coding is also used in the Dirac video codec.

== Generalization to order k ==
To encode larger numbers in fewer bits (at the expense of using more bits to encode smaller numbers), this can be generalized using a nonnegative integer parameter k. To encode a nonnegative integer x in an order-k exp-Golomb code:

1. Encode ⌊x/2^{k}⌋ using order-0 exp-Golomb code described above, then
2. Encode x mod 2^{k} in binary with k bits

An equivalent way of expressing this is:

1. Encode x+2^{k}−1 using the order-0 exp-Golomb code (i.e. encode x+2^{k} using the Elias gamma code), then
2. Delete k leading zero bits from the encoding result

Exp-Golomb-k coding examples
x	k=0	k=1	k=2	k=3	x	k=0	k=1	k=2	k=3	x	k=0	k=1	k=2	k=3
0	1	10	100	1000	10	0001011	001100	01110	010010	20	000010101	00010110	0011000	011100
1	010	11	101	1001	11	0001100	001101	01111	010011	21	000010110	00010111	0011001	011101
2	011	0100	110	1010	12	0001101	001110	0010000	010100	22	000010111	00011000	0011010	011110
3	00100	0101	111	1011	13	0001110	001111	0010001	010101	23	000011000	00011001	0011011	011111
4	00101	0110	01000	1100	14	0001111	00010000	0010010	010110	24	000011001	00011010	0011100	00100000
5	00110	0111	01001	1101	15	000010000	00010001	0010011	010111	25	000011010	00011011	0011101	00100001
6	00111	001000	01010	1110	16	000010001	00010010	0010100	011000	26	000011011	00011100	0011110	00100010
7	0001000	001001	01011	1111	17	000010010	00010011	0010101	011001	27	000011100	00011101	0011111	00100011
8	0001001	001010	01100	010000	18	000010011	00010100	0010110	011010	28	000011101	00011110	000100000	00100100
9	0001010	001011	01101	010001	19	000010100	00010101	0010111	011011	29	000011110	00011111	000100001	00100101

== See also ==
- Elias gamma (γ) coding
- Elias delta (δ) coding
- Elias omega (ω) coding
- Universal code
