= Lowenstam =

Origin
- Languages: German, Yiddish
- Meaning: lion + trunk (stem)
- Region of origin: Poland, Netherlands, Germany, Czech Republic

Other names
- Variant forms: Lyon, Löw, Löwe, Lowenstein
- Surnames in Beider, Alexander (2004). A Dictionary of Jewish Surnames from Galicia, Bergenfield, New Jersey: Avotaynu.

Lowenstam is a German-language surname, which means "lion trunk". Alternative spellings include Löwenstam, Löwenstamm, Loewenstam and Loewenstamm. The name may refer to:

- Arthur Löwenstamm (1882–1965), rabbi and theologian from Germany
- Aryeh Leib ben Saul Löwenstamm (1690–1755), Polish rabbi
- Heinz A. Lowenstam (1912–1993), American scientist
- Hirschel Löwenstam (1721–1800), British rabbi
- Saul Lowenstam (1717–1790), Dutch rabbi

== See also ==
- Lowenstein
