= Even–Rodeh coding =

Even–Rodeh code is a universal code encoding the non-negative integers developed by Shimon Even and Michael Rodeh.

== Encoding ==
To code a non-negative integer N in Even–Rodeh coding:

1. If N is not less than 4 then set the coded value to a single 0 bit. Otherwise the coded value is empty.
2. If N is less than 8 then prepend the coded value with 3 bits containing the value of N and stop.
3. Prepend the coded value with the binary representation of N.
4. Store the number of bits prepended in step 3 as the new value of N.
5. Go back to step 2.

To decode an Even–Rodeh-coded integer:

1. Read 3 bits and store the value into N.
  - If the first bit read was 0 then stop. The decoded number is N.
  - If the first bit read was 1 then continue to step 2.
2. Examine the next bit.
  - If the bit is 0 then read 1 bit and stop. The decoded number is N.
  - If the bit is 1 then read N bits, store the value as the new value of N, and go back to step 2.

== Examples ==
Number	Encoding	Implied probability
0	000	1/8
1	001	1/8
2	010	1/8
3	011	1/8
4	100 0	1/16
5	101 0	1/16
6	110 0	1/16
7	111 0	1/16
8	100 1000 0	1/256
9	100 1001 0	1/256
︙
15	100 1111 0	1/256
16	101 10000 0	1/512
︙
2761	100 1100 101011001001 0	1/1,048,576
︙

== See also ==
- Elias omega (ω) coding
