= Levenstein =

Levenstein, Levenshtein is a surname. Notable people with the surname include:

- Jim Levenstein, a fictional character in the American Pie film series
- Matvey Levenstein (born 1960), Russian-American painter
- Vladimir Levenshtein (1935-2017), Russian scientist
  - Levenshtein distance, a metric for comparing two strings or words
  - Levenshtein coding, a binary number coding
- Yechezkel Levenstein, Mashgiach in the Yeshivas Mir and in Ponovezh, known as Reb Chatzkel

== See also ==
- Löwenstein (disambiguation)
