= Gamma encoding =

Gamma encoding may refer to:

- Gamma correction, a digital image encoding optimization technique
- Elias gamma coding, a positive integer data compression technique
