= Lewenstein =

Lewenstein is a Yiddish-language surname.

Notable people with the name include:

- Maciej Lewenstein, Polish theoretical physicist
- Moshe Yaakov Kopel HaLevi Lewenstein, German rabbi and writer
- Oscar Lewenstein, British theatre and film producer

== See also ==
- Levenstein, a surname, including a list of people with the name
- Lowenstein (surname), including a list of people with the name
