= Gary P. Naftalis =

American lawyer

Gary P. Naftalis (born November 23, 1941) is an American trial lawyer, and head of the litigation department and co-chair of Kramer Levin Naftalis & Frankel LLP, a New York City law firm.

== Education ==
Naftalis graduated Phi Beta Kappa from Rutgers University (A.B. 1963), earned a master's degree in history at Brown University (M.A. 1965), and graduated from Columbia Law School (1967), where he was an editor on the Columbia Law Review.

== Career ==
After clerking for William B. Herlands on the U.S. District Court for the Southern District of New York, he joined the U.S. Attorney's Office for the Southern District of New York. Naftalis spent six years at the Office, ultimately holding the post of Deputy Chief of the Criminal Division. After a stint as Special Assistant to the U.S. Attorney for the Virgin Islands, Naftalis entered private practice, first as a partner at Orans, Elsen, Polstein & Naftalis, and then as a partner at Kramer Levin Naftalis & Frankel LLP. Naftalis has also been a Lecturer in Law at Columbia Law School and Harvard Law School.

Naftalis was awarded the Benemerenti medal by Pope Benedict XVI.

=== Selected representations ===
Naftalis has been involved in high-profile litigations over three decades. He successfully defended Michael Eisner, the CEO of The Walt Disney Company, in a 37-day shareholders derivative trial relating to the hiring and termination of Michael Ovitz. He has successfully represented securities industry clients, including Salomon Brothers in the federal criminal and SEC investigations of U.S. Treasury auction bidding practices, and Kidder Peabody in connection with the Wall Street insider trading scandal and ensuing civil litigations. He also successfully represented Canary Capital Partners in the ongoing mutual fund investigations and related civil litigations, and Gary Winnick, the Chairman and Founder of Global Crossing.

Naftalis was counsel to Kenneth Langone in the litigation brought by the New York State Attorney General relating to the compensation of New York Stock Exchange Chairman Richard Grasso. He also represented Cosmo Corigliano, the former Chief Financial Officer of the former Cendant, Bristol-Myers Squibb and Oxford Health Systems; the General Counsel of Rite Aid; the investment banking firm CIBC in the Enron investigation; a director and senior officer of Tyco in the securities class action and ERISA litigation; the former CEO of Refco, Phillip R. Bennett; and the former CEO of Arthur Andersen in the Enron civil litigation.

Naftalis was counsel for Ian Schrager in the Studio 54 tax evasion case; E. Robert Wallach, a San Francisco attorney and counsel to former attorney general Edwin Meese, in a federal criminal trial arising out of the Wedtech government contracting scandal; and a Saudi Arabian banker in proceedings before the Federal Reserve Board relating to the disposition of his interest in the Bank of Credit and Commerce International, as well as civil litigation brought by the liquidators of BCCI, seeking $10 billion in damages.

Naftalis represented the city of New York in the inquiry by the New York County District Attorney relating to the 2007 fire at the Deutsche Bank building at the World Trade Center.

Naftalis represented Rajat Gupta, former director of Goldman Sachs and Procter & Gamble, who was accused of leaking company secrets to a billionaire hedge fund manager.

=== Selected publications ===
- Frankel, Marvin E; Naftalis, Gary P (1977). The grand jury: an institution on trial. Hill and Wang. ISBN 9780809050925. OCLC 2910942.
- Naftalis, Gary P (1983). Seminar in trial practice. Columbia University School of Law. OCLC 22558874.

== Personal life ==
He is married to Donna (nee Arditi) Naftalis, a learning specialist in New York. They have four children.
