= Kramer Levin Naftalis & Frankel =

American law firm

- Headquarters: New York City
- No. of offices: 3
- No. of attorneys: about 325
- Major practice areas: General practice
- Key people: Marvin E. Frankel; Ezra G. Levin; Gary P. Naftalis; Eugene Nickerson
- Revenue: $387 million
- Date founded: 1968 (New York City)
- Founder: Arthur Kramer; Louis Lowenstein; Maurice Nessen; Sherwin Kamin
- Website: www.kramerlevin.com

Kramer Levin Naftalis & Frankel LLP (known as Kramer Levin) was an American law firm headquartered in New York City with branch offices in Silicon Valley, California; Washington, D.C.; and Paris, France. In 2025 Kramer Levin merged with British silver circle law firm Herbert Smith Freehills to form Herbert Smith Freehills Kramer.

== History ==
The firm was founded in New York City in 1968, as Kramer, Lowenstein, Nessen & Kamin. Founding members include Arthur Kramer, Louis Lowenstein, Maurice Nessen, and Sherwin Kamin. When Eugene Nickerson joined the firm in 1971, its name changed to Nickerson, Kramer, Lowenstein, Nessen & Kamin.

The firm's current name, Kramer Levin Naftalis & Frankel LLP, resulted from personnel changes over 1978–1983, including Nickerson leaving to join the federal bench of the Eastern District of New York, Lou Lowenstein leaving to join the faculty of Columbia Law School, and Ezra G. Levin and former Southern District of New York judge Marvin E. Frankel each becoming name partners, as did Gary P. Naftalis, a decade later.

From 2000–2007, Kramer Levin was the exclusive U.S. referral firm to U.K. firm Berwin Leighton Paisner (BLP), meaning BLP would exclusively refer its clients to Kramer Levin for U.S. cases. The alliance was then changed to "preferred firm" status, meaning that the two firms would still collaborate but without exclusive referrals. There was speculation that the referral relationship was intended to become a merger.

In April 2012, anti-Muslim author Robert Spencer was scheduled to speak at the Kramer Levin offices about his book Did Muhammad Exist? An Inquiry Into Islam's Obscure Origins, but the firm canceled the event in response to pressure by the Council on American-Islamic Relations (CAIR).

== Merger with Herbert Smith Freehills ==
In November 2024, Kramer Levin announced it would merge with Herbert Smith Freehills to form a fully-integrated firm. In April 2025, the firms announced that their partnerships had voted in favor of merger, and completion of the merger took place on 1 June 2025. The firm is now known as Herbert Smith Freehills Kramer.

== Offices ==
Kramer Levin has an office in Paris, France, which it acquired in 1999 from the legacy U.S. firm Rogers & Wells which did not want to merge with the rest of the firm to London-based Clifford Chance. The firm maintains relationships with other firms throughout the world. There are 35 lawyers at the Paris office, which focuses on finance and corporate law. In September 2011, Kramer Levin opened its Silicon Valley office in Menlo Park, California, expanding its intellectual property practice.

Each department at Kramer Levin, according to a study of the firm by Chambers Associates, has an assigning partner. There is "no formal rotation through the different sub-practices", meaning that lawyers at the firm can choose their direction. The juniors that Chambers spoke to had opportunities to work directly for partners. While the firm has offices in Paris and Silicon Valley, 95% of its attorneys are based in New York. In 2019, first-year associates of the firm were scheduled for $205,000 annual base compensation, before bonus.

== Practice areas ==
In 2021, the firm had 324 lawyers. Many of the firm's attorneys have served as directors of nonprofit legal service providers, such as the Legal Aid Society, as well as other community-based nonprofits. The firm's areas of practice include: corporate law, white-collar defense, land use, and intellectual property.

The firm has a pro bono program. The firm served with Lambda Legal as co-counsel to petition the New York Court of Appeals to recognize the rights of same-sex couples to marry. This legal challenge was not successful. In 2010, the firm represented a lesbian high-school student who was denied the right to attend her prom with her girlfriend, wearing a tuxedo.

In 2013, in response to a suggestion by special counsel Brendan Schulman, Kramer Levin began to practice drone law. One of the first clients of the firm's unmanned aircraft systems practice was Raphael Pirker, who was fined $10,000 by the Federal Aviation Administration (FAA) for allegedly flying his drone too low and too close to people while making an aerial video. In April 2014, Kramer Levin represented Texas EquuSearch Mounted Search and Recovery Team, which uses camera-bearing drones to find missing people, in a challenge against a FAA directive prohibiting their use of drones.

In 2013, Kramer Levin hired John P. "Sean" Coffey to run its complex litigation group. Coffey had attracted the firm's attention with his "aggressive" defense of Goldman Sachs trader Fabrice Tourre in a Manhattan case brought by the Securities and Exchange Commission.

In 2014, Kramer Levin announced that it had expanded its intellectual property group by hiring Christine Willgoos as special counsel. In 2011, the firm had about 60 attorneys working in intellectual property.

In 2014, Kramer Levin hired Jeffrey Mulligan, former executive director of New York City's Board of Standards and Appeals and a former official of the Department of City Planning, as a planning and development specialist in the firm's land use practice.

== Rankings ==
Gross revenue of $390,000,000 in 2020 placed the firm at 98th on The American Lawyer's 2021 Am Law 200 ranking. The publication also ranked Kramer Levin as the 131st highest-grossing law firm in the world on its 2021 Global 200 survey. The 2021 National Law Journal NLJ 500 also ranked the firm 134th in the U.S., based on size.
