= Barrie Karp =

American painter and academic (1945–2019)

- Born: Barrie L. Karp; February 10, 1945; Laredo, Texas, U.S.
- Died: September 27, 2019 (aged 74); New York City, New York, U.S.
- Occupations: Painter and academic

Barrie Karp (February 10, 1945 – September 27, 2019) was an American artist, independent scholar, and academic. She was an educator in philosophy, cultural studies, humanities and arts from a feminist and anti-racist perspective in New York City colleges and universities from 1970 until her death in 2019.

Karp was part of the founding generation of academic feminist educators, producing cutting edge-pedagogy in academic fields that, by the 1990s became categorized, disciplined, and designated as cultural and media studies, gender studies, critical race theory and queer theory. Her work stood at the intersection of gender critique and anti-racist activism. Karp's pedagogy and practice sought to further define a rigorous mode of inquiry in feminist and anti-racist studies. Karp envisioned feminism as a movement that can work across disciplinary boundaries and be informed by various traditions of inquiry. Her work was informed by her lifelong study of psychoanalysis.

Some of Karp's paintings appeared in the November/December 2008 issue of Tikkun magazine, as well as in the Tikkun editor's August 2009 online blog, and in the spring 2012 issue of On the Issues Magazine. In 1988, Karp had a one-person exhibition at the Everhart Museum in Scranton, Pennsylvania.

== Early life and education ==
Karp grew up first in Scranton and Wilkes-Barre and then, in the latter part of her childhood, in Williamsport, Pennsylvania, and the surrounding Lycoming County area.

== Academic career and art studies ==
After studying painting and liberal arts at Chatham College from 1962 through 1964, Karp transferred to Columbia College, where she earned a B.S. in 1967 in the Philosophy Department. She was an educator in philosophy, cultural studies, humanities and arts from a feminist and anti-racist perspective in New York City colleges and universities from 1970 and continued to teach until nearly the end of her life. She taught the first feminist philosophy course at Hunter College in 1978. She filed an unsuccessful discrimination case against City College over her complaints to the affirmative action office about a "current and historical lack of female Philosophy Department faculty members at CCNY."

She completed a doctorate (1979) in the Philosophy Department at CUNY Graduate Center. Her doctoral dissertation was titled "Persons and Self-Deception". In 1982, she joined the faculty of The New School and the School of Visual Arts (Humanities and Sciences Department, Philosophy and Cultural Studies tracks), and in 1988, the faculty of Eugene Lang College The New School for Liberal Arts at Eugene Lang College.

Karp began art studies with Maria Lowenstein (1954 to 1959) and Ian James, 1962. After her Chatham College studies, she also studied art at Provincetown Workshop (Leo Manso, Victor Candell, summer 1964) and New York University (Leo Manso, fall 1964, spring 1965). After completing her PhD she studied at the New School for Social Research (Leo Manso, early 1980s); with the Art Students League (Leo Manso, Rudolf Baranik, 1981-1983); and at the Provincetown Art Association Museum School (Selena Trieff, 1983).

In the final decade of her life, Karp practiced photography, archived ancestral photos, and wrote about family photography, self-portraiture, portraiture and other kinds of photography. Karp's photographs, like her painting, are intimate explorations of the self and relationships. She is said to have loved the Diane Arbus quote: "A photo is a secret about a secret." Musician, filmmaker, and photographer Jon Sholle praised the "vision" and "concept" of Karp's photographs. Artist, musician, and photographer Joe Morris praised Karp's great regard for the subjects in her photos, seeing "beauty in things that are ignored by most people".

== Activism on Karp's behalf ==
In Spring 2008, Lang College The New School for Liberal Arts students conducted peaceful protests, including a conversation with faculty at a Lang College faculty meeting and at other meetings with faculty, administrators, and students; and demonstrating in the college's courtyard and student publications in the Lang College The New School for Liberal Arts paper, "New School Free Press", sometimes also known as IMPRINT. Students created a public support group on Facebook that they titled Lang Needs Barrie!!! where they put their writings and other materials related to the case. This public support group still existed as of 2019. In an article by Kevin Dugan in the April 1, 2008, issue of the New School Free Press, a Lang senior, Jamila Thompson, was quoted as saying: "If it can happen to Barrie, it can happen to anybody....our voices are not valued." According to then-Lang student Anna Bean, in an opinion piece published in the April 15, 2008, New School Free Press, stated that 120 students, faculty, and alumni of Lang have signed the petition urging the administration to reconsider the decision" to not renew Karp's contract. In an April 29, 2008, letter to the editor in the New School Free Press, Lang alumna Michelle Salerno described Karp as "the finest professor I ever had" and lauded Karp's "breadth of knowledge on feminism, critical race studies, philosophy and the arts".

The Karp case continued to receive wide attention in the ensuing years. In an article in Harper's Magazine in October 2010, Susan Faludi wrote: "Soon after the culture and media department absorbed and then dissolved the gender-studies program, Karp was forced out. Not that her expulsion made way for an updated feminist studies. With her departure, the number of professors in the department dedicated to teaching feminism dropped to zero.""

== Works, reviews and listings ==
- 2016, with Bonnie Zindel's "Notes from the Creative Literary Arts Editor With a watercolor2, 2015, by Barrie Karp PhD", Psychoanalytic Perspectives, Volume 13, Issue 1, 2016,
- "Mom & Her Girlfriend at 14". Psychoanalytic Perspectives. 13 (1). 2016.
- 2012 — "Art by Barrie Karp", Spring 2012, On the Issues magazine, Self-portrait (painted in Provincetown). Oil on canvas. 60 x 52in. [2012 scan from slide made circa 1984]
- 2002 — Barrie Karp, in "Art & Observance — School of Visual Arts Commemorates 9/11", exhibition catalog, p. 14, two drawings by Barrie Karp published
- 1993 — Feminist Studies, 19:2, Summer 1993, pp. 314 & 320
- IKON Magazine No. 7, Spring–Summer 1987, p. 124
- 1989 — Eileen O'Neill, "(Re)presentations of Eros: Exploring Female Sexual Agency," in Alison Jaggar, Susan R. Bordo, eds, Gender/Body/Knowledge – Feminist Reconstructions of Being & Knowing, New Brunswick, New Jersey: Rutgers University Press, 1989, pp. 68–91
- 1987 — Eileen O'Neill, "The Re-Imaging of Eros: Women Construct Their Own Sexuality," in IKON Magazine No. 7, Spring–Summer 1987, pp. 118–126
- 1987 & 2005 — Greg Masters, 2005, online review of "Barrie Karp/John Duch" (Rastovski Gallery, East Village, January 28-February 15, 1987). Previously published in 1987, Cover magazine, posted online 2005.
- Listed in Guide to A.I.R. Gallery Archives, ca. 1972-2006, MSS 184, Fales Library and Special Collections, Elmer Holmes Bobst Library
- Listed & reviewed at Abstract Art Online
