= Lovenstein =

Lovenstein is a surname. Notable people with the surname include:

- Rebecca Lovenstein (1888–1971), American lawyer
- William Lovenstein (1840–1896), American politician

== See also ==
- Lowenstein (surname)
