= Lowenstein =

Lowenstein or Loewenstein (German: Löwenstein) may refer to:

== People ==
- Lowenstein (surname), includes a list of notable people with the name (of either spelling)

== Places ==
- Loewenstein Peak, an ice-free peak located in the Cruzen Range of Victoria Land, Antarctica
- Löwenstein, a town in Baden-Württemberg, Germany
- Löwenstein Castle, an 18th-century structure in Kleinheubach, Germany
- Löwenstein Hills, a hill range of Baden-Württemberg, Germany
- Löwenstein-Wertheim, a former state of the Holy Roman Empire

== Other uses ==
- 23298 Loewenstein, a minor planet
- Loewenstein's blue, a species of butterfly in the family Lycaenidae
- Lowenstein Sandler, an American law firm based in New Jersey
- Löwenstein–Jensen medium, a growth medium more commonly known as LJ medium

== See also ==
- All pages with titles beginning with or or
- All pages with titles containing or or
- Levenstein, a surname
- Lewenstein, a surname
