= Ezra G. Levin =

American lawyer (1934–2022)

Ezra G. Levin (born Ezra Gurion Levin; February 10, 1934 – October 31, 2022) was co-chair of the law firm Kramer Levin Naftalis & Frankel LLP, and was involved in corporate law for more than 40 years as a counselor, teacher and director. He has been listed in the peer-selected The Best Lawyers in America since its inception.

Levin served on the board of directors of numerous clients including a Fortune 200 company, served as trustee (appointed by the Securities Investor Protection Corporation) of a failed brokerage firm, and held several judicial appointments as special master. He taught courses in corporate law, corporate finance, mergers and acquisitions, and securities regulation, and advised public and private corporations in those areas.

== Education ==
- LL.B., Columbia Law School, 1959
- A.B., Columbia University, 1955

== Other activities ==
- President, Hebrew Free Loan Society of New York
- President, Jewish Community Relations Council of Greater New York, 2001–2004

== Teaching ==
- Columbia University, Adjunct Associate Professor, 1974–1977; Professor, 1986, 1992
- University of Wisconsin Law School, Visiting Professor, Summers 1967 (Corporations) and 1998 (Mergers and Acquisitions)
- University of Connecticut Law School, Lecturer, Securities Regulation and Corporate Finance, 1970-1973 *
- Russell Sage Foundation, Resident Fellow in Law and the Social Sciences, 1965

== Professional Affiliations ==
- American Bar Association, Section of Corporations, Banking and Business Law, 1982–Present
- Law and Society Association, 1965–Present

== Biography ==
Ezra lived with his wife Batya Levin in The Bronx NYC. He has 2 children and 6 grandchildren who live in Israel and Colorado. Passed away in Jerusalem capital of Israel.
