= Abraham Naftali Hertz Scheuer =

German Orthodox rabbi and kabbalist

Abraham Naftali Hertz Scheuer was a German Orthodox rabbi and kabbalist, born in Frankfurt am Main in 1753 to Rabbi David Tebele Scheuer and his second wife (daughter of Rabbi Nathan Otiz, rabbi of Bamberg).

He led his father's yeshiva in Mainz as its Rosh Yeshiva from 1778 until 1782, taking over from his brother Rabbi Mechel Scheuer. In 1811 he became Rabbi of Mainz where he died on October 10, 1822. He is known for his halakhic ruling against the use of an organ in synagogues in the book Eleh Dibre ha-B'rit (Altona 1819).

== Notable students ==
- Jakob Löwenstein
