= Eliezer Heilbut =

German rabbi

Rabbi Eliezer Lazi ben Joseph ben Lazi Heilbut (1740 – 1814) served as a dayan in Posen, then as Rosh Beth Din (Chief Justice) of the AHU (an acronym for the threesome kehilla of Altona, Hamburg, and Wandsbek).

He was the author of Mishnas DeRebbi Eliezer (Hebrew: משנת דרבי אליעזר).

== Biography ==
Rabbi Eliezer Heilbut was born in Berlin in 1740 to his father Rabbi Joseph Heilbut who was the son of the Kabbalist Rabbi Lazi Chosid of Halberstadt, after whom he was named. He had an ailing childhood, but nevertheless was a child prodigy. In his teens he studied in the yeshiva of Rabbi David Tebele Scheuer in Bamberg. He married Beila, the daughter of Tauderes Munk, a respected member of the kehilla in Posen. Then he studied for two years in the yeshiva of Rabbi Gedalia Tiktin, rabbi of Schwersenz close by to Posen, and his father-in-law supported him.

In Posen he taught students, then was appointed as dayan there. At that time Rabbi Raphael Cohen was rabbi of Posen. When Rabbi Raphael Cohen was accepted as Rabbi of the threesome kehilla AHU, Rabbi Eliezer Heilbut followed him there. In 1784 he was appointed as dayan of Wandsbek. In 1799, after Cohen left his position as rabbi of AHU, Heilbut was appointed as chief justice of the kehila. During the Napoleonic Wars, he was the liaison between AHU and Napoleon's general Louis Davout. He died in Hamburg in 1814 (1 Shevat 5574 on the Hebrew calendar) and because of the siege on the city he was buried on the grounds of the synagogue there.
