= Matvey Levenstein =

Russian-American painter (born 1960)

- Born: 1960 (age 65–66); Moscow, U.S.S.R.
- Education: Yale School of Art
- Known for: Painting

Matvey Levenstein (born 1960) is a Russian-American painter best known for his oil on copper, wood, and linen; and sumi ink on paper depictions of landscapes and interior/still lifes that explore themes of history and representation. Invoking the intersection at which avant-garde cinema meets the tradition of European painting, Levenstein's work explores and embodies the object-image relationship.

== Life and education ==
Levenstein was born in 1960 in Moscow, U.S.S.R. He attended the Moscow Architectural Institute before immigrating to the United States from the Soviet Union as a political refugee as part of Jewish immigration in 1980. He has a B.F.A. from the Art Institute of Chicago, and received his M.F.A. from the Yale School of Art.

He lives and works in New York City.

== Career ==
Levenstein is represented by Kasmin Gallery (New York) and Galleria Lorcan O'Neill (Rome, Italy). His work was presented in solo exhibitions at Kasmin in 2019 and 2021, and at Galleria Lorcan O'Neill in 2007, 2012, 2017 and 2023. He has also had several solo exhibitions at Larissa Goldston Gallery (New York), and the Jack Tilton Gallery (New York).

Levenstein has been the recipient of several awards and honors including the 2022 Louis Comfort Tiffany Foundation Biennial Award, the American Academy in Rome, Rome Prize; the Penny McCall Foundation Award, the Marie Walsh Sharpe Foundation Studio Grant, the Jewish Foundation's Katherine J. Horwich Grant, and the Anna Louise Raymond Traveling Fellowship from the School of the Art Institute of Chicago.

His work is included in the collections of the Modern Art Museum of Fort Worth, Denver Art Museum, and The Progressive Art Collection. Recent publications featuring Levenstein's paintings are Landscape Painting Now: From Pop Abstraction to New Romanticism (2019) and (Nothing but) Flowers (2021), among others.

== Work ==
The subjects of Levenstein's paintings are the subjects of autonomy. Atmospheric landscapes that suggest the possibility of the sublime, and domestic interiors with implied privacy and personhood, portray the conditions under which an object of autonomous painting might be possible. Invoking the intersection at which avant-garde cinema meets the tradition of European painting, Levenstein's work explores and embodies the object-image relationship.

Reviewing his 2019 solo exhibition at Kasmin Gallery, Peter Schjeldahl wrote in The New Yorker, "Can loveliness shock? Yes, as witness the fantastically skilled and sensitive neo- or para- or faux-Romantic (you decide) work of Matvey Levenstein ... Caspar David Friedrich comes to mind as an ancestral spirit, but the work recalls no specific precedent. Its tenor is coolly confident, assuming a viewer's empathy. That jolts. You would expect a wink or a nudge, or a smack of naïveté or perversity in so atavistic a style. But no soap. Levenstein's temerity fascinates."

Matvey Levenstein, "Mirror," 2021, oil on linen, 48 x 40 inches

Robert Becker, writing for The New Criterion, remarked "There's an all-over radiance coming from somewhere beneath the surfaces of Levenstein's paintings, dispersing light evenly like a fine mist on a still morning. It's an artist's trick and heaven knows how he mastered it."

Matvey Levenstein, "Winter," 2015, sumi ink on paper, 45.5 x 34.75 inches

Levenstein acknowledges that since the early 90s he has painted from photographs. In 1995 he presented a group of work at Jack Tilton Gallery of paintings and drawings based on black and white photographs of his family, Russian Jews, and bourgeois interiors. He would go on to use his own photography as the basis for his work, focusing on imagery that he described as "less nameable situations." Levenstein has explained his cinematic approach to painting and his use of photography, saying "I realized I was not interested in the photograph as much as the projected image, the way a movie is projected onto the screen. That is something that I wanted my painting to physically function much closer to, rather than it resembling a photograph, even though I was using photographs and engaging in the dialogue with an object of a photograph. Later, they became almost like scenes from a movie."

Thyrza Nihols Goodeve, responding to Levenstein's series of Church interiors, described Levenstein as "a painter of exquisite quiet where interiority seems to emanate from every brushstroke, Matvey Levenstein presents the interiors of religious buildings–here the church, the temple, and the cathedral–with a sense of temporality and sentiment far removed from the frantic pastiche of the cut and paste frenzy of the Internet age. In fact these spaces come from "no time" for time is not their métier, paint is ... Neither authentic nor kitsch but rooted in the fundamentals of painting "by moving backward you in fact can step ahead." ... Levenstein wields painterly sentiment into a kind of Brechtean alienation effect."

== Teaching positions ==
Levenstein was a Visiting Artist at The Cooper Union School for the Advancement of Science and Art, Tyler School of Art, and New York University. He was a Visiting Critic at the School of the Arts, Columbia University and Yale School of Art.

Levenstein has held teaching positions at the School of the Arts, Columbia University; Pratt Institute; The Cooper Union School for the Advancement of Science and Art; Yale School of Art; Rhode Island School of Design; Tyler School of Art; Yale Norfolk Summer School of Art; Princeton University; and New York University.

Levenstein currently teaches at the School of Visual Art, New York, NY.
