= Peter Elias =

American information theorist

- Born: November 23, 1923; New Brunswick, New Jersey, US
- Died: December 7, 2001 (aged 78); Cambridge, Massachusetts, US
- Education: Massachusetts Institute of Technology; Harvard University
- Known for: Binary erasure channel Convolutional code List decoding Arithmetic coding Error exponent Universal code (data compression); Differential pulse-code modulation
- Scientific career
- Fields: Information theory, Coding theory

Peter Elias (November 23, 1923 – December 7, 2001) was a pioneer in the field of information theory. Born in New Brunswick, New Jersey, he was a member of the Massachusetts Institute of Technology faculty from 1953 to 1991. In 1955, Elias introduced convolutional codes as an alternative to block codes. He also established the binary erasure channel and proposed list decoding of error-correcting codes as an alternative to unique decoding.

== Career ==
Peter Elias was a member of the Massachusetts Institute of Technology faculty from 1953 to 1991. His students included Elwyn Berlekamp and he was a colleague of Claude Shannon. From 1957 until 1966, he served as one of three founding editors of Information and Control.

== Awards ==
Elias received the Claude E. Shannon Award of the IEEE Information Theory Society (1977); the Golden Jubilee Award for Technological Innovation of the IEEE Information Theory Society (1998); and the IEEE Richard W. Hamming Medal (2002).

== Family ==
Peter Elias was born on November 23, 1923, in New Brunswick, New Jersey. His father Nathaniel Mendel Elias worked for Thomas Edison in his Edison, New Jersey, laboratory after graduating from Columbia University with a degree in chemical engineering.

== Death ==
Elias died (at age 78) on December 7, 2001, of Creutzfeldt–Jakob disease.

== See also ==
- Elias coding
