= David Tebele Scheuer =

Jacob Moses David Tebele Scheuer (1712–1782) was a German rabbi.

== Biography ==
Born in Frankfurt am Main in 1712, he was one of the outstanding students of Rabbi Jacob Poppers, author of Shav Ya'akov, in Frankfurt. He served as Dayan of Frankfurt during the entire time that the Pnei Yehoshua, Rabbi Yehoshua Falk was Rabbi of Frankfurt (1741-1756). In 1759 he succeeded his father-in-law Rabbi Nathan Otiz as Rabbi of Bamberg. There during the Third Silesian War; part of the Seven Years' War (1756-1763), where Austria under the Empress Maria Theresa of Austria tried for the second time in vain to get back Silesia from Prussia; the Prussians under King Frederick the Great ravaged and plundered the region. In 1763 during the turmoil, Rabbi Tebele lost many of his writings including his writings on the tractate Niddah, which he greatly bemoaned. In 1767 he was appointed as Rabbi of Mainz where he led a Yeshiva. He died there in 1782 (Shmini Atzeres 5543 on the Hebrew calendar).

== Pupils ==
Among his early pupils is Rabbi Levi Pante and Rabbi Eliezer Lazi, who studied with him in Bamberg, and among his later pupils was the Chasam Sofer. He also left two sons; Rabbi Mechel Scheuer, Rabbi of Worms and Rabbi Abraham Naftali Hertz Scheuer, who later served as Rabbi of Mainz.
