= Jürgen Löwenstein =

Israeli Holocaust survivor (1925–2018)

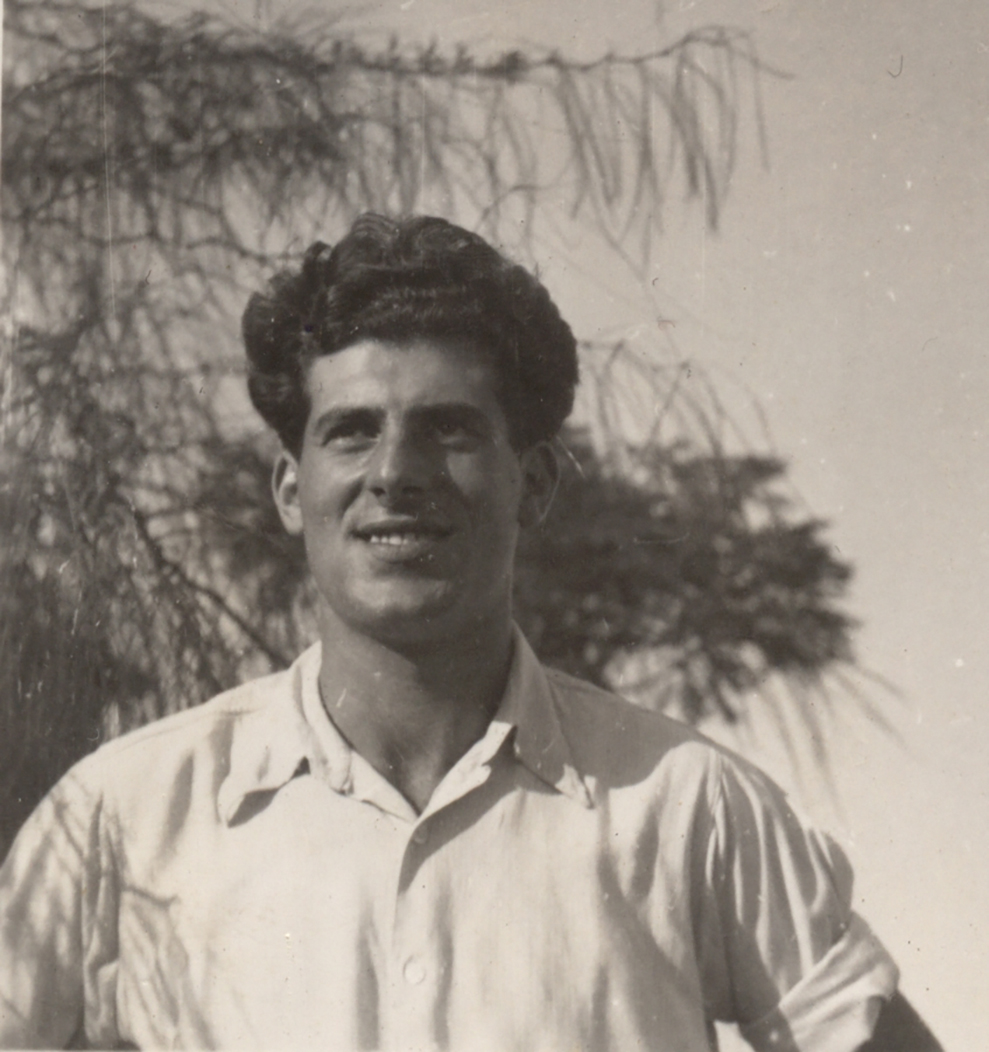
Jürgen in Dorot in 1949

Jürgen Löwenstein (March 28, 1925 – February 16, 2018) was a German-born Israeli citizen. He survived the Auschwitz and Mauthausen concentration camps and was the subject of a biography titled Jürgen Löwenstein, the fate of a Jewish kid from Berlin, written by Samuel Herzfeld and published by Editions Jourdan in 2022. The book has been the subject of numerous reviews in the French-speaking press.

== Early life ==
Jürgen Löwenstein was born in Berlin on March 28, 1925, under the name Jürgen Rolf Sochaczewer. Paula, Jürgen's mother, divorced her son's biological father at an early age. She remarried Walter Löwenstein, who officially adopted Jürgen. It is him that Jürgen would always consider as his father, rather than his biological father.

The Löwensteins led a modest life. They considered themselves primarily as German citizens of Jewish origin but assimilated into modern society and the Berlin life of the time.

== Nazi persecution ==
Shortly after the Nazi rise to power, Jürgen witnessed from his apartment the Nazi book burnings of May 10, 1933, during which anti-Semitic songs were sung and tens of thousands of books are burned. This show of force against the "non-German spirit" marked, for Jürgen, the beginning of a policy of organized persecution against Jews in Germany. In 1935, the Nuremberg Laws on the protection of German blood further isolated Jews from the rest of the population. Jürgen's family was soon evicted from the apartment they rented. Then came Kristallnacht, with stores destroyed, windows shattered, displays devastated, and Jürgen's schooling brought to an end.

After the events of 1938, Jürgen became aware of the urgency of leaving Germany. Having been exposed to Zionist ideals from a young age, he joined the Hachsharah camp in Schniebinchen, a preparatory camp for emigration to Mandatory Palestine, where he was introduced to physical labor and agricultural work. Once the Schniebinchen camp was dismantled, he moved to the one in Rüdnitz, still in the Berlin area. However, the situation for Jews in Germany continued to worsen. In 1941, the Rüdnitz camp was also dismantled by the Nazis, and unable to emigrate, Jürgen was assigned to forced labor for the Reich at Eichow-Mühle.

On January 9, 1942, Jürgen and some of his friends arrived in Paderborn as forced laborers. This time, it was not a Nazi-controlled Hachsharah camp, but a real labor camp. The living conditions became increasingly precarious and difficult, but solidarity began to form among the members of the group. He remained there until February 1943.

== Concentration camps ==
Jürgen was deported to Auschwitz from Paderborn on March 1, 1943. He arrived at the Birkenau complex (Auschwitz II) on March 3, 1943. Following the selection that took place at the Judenrampe, he was assigned to labor, along with other friends from his group in Paderborn.

From the ramp, he was transported by truck to the Buna-Monowitz concentration camp, known as Auschwitz III. This was followed by forced undressing, head shaving, and the assignment of a registration number. Jürgen was tattooed with the number 104 9832 on his left forearm.

Jürgen was assigned to the construction of silos and warehouses that were to later become part of the infrastructure. The working conditions were extremely harsh, and the two months Jürgen spent at Buna-Monowitz turned out to be the most difficult phase of his time in the camp.

Once he fell ill, he was transferred to the infirmary of the Stammlager at Auschwitz I. A work opportunity arose there, and Jürgen seized it, as staying in the infirmary would have meant death. He worked as a laborer tasked with smoothing the road surfaces and was housed in Block 23a. He stayed there for a month until he learned that a new annex of the Auschwitz camp, Eintrachthütte, was to be built about thirty kilometers from the main camp. He volunteered and was transferred. Jürgen arrived at Eintrachthütte concentration camp in May 1943, where he stayed until the evacuation of the camp in January 1945.

A death march began for Jürgen and the other prisoners still alive. The goal was to reach Germany on foot. It was a transfer that lasted several days in the cold. He finally arrived at the Mauthausen concentration camp, exhausted and drained of all his strength. Chaos reigned there, and there was no longer any forced labor, as the S.S. realized the unfavorable outcome of the war and abandoned the camp.

On May 5, 1945, the Mauthausen camp was liberated by the Americans.

== After the war ==
Following the liberation of the Mauthausen camp, a long period of convalescence began for Jürgen. He spent more than a year in the Baumgartner Höhe sanatorium in Vienna. Once he had recovered, he made his decision: he wanted to emigrate to Israel. Due to the restrictive immigration policy in Mandatory Palestine toward Jews, he had to wait for the independence of the State of Israel in 1948 to leave Europe.

Upon arriving in Israel, he joined the kibbutz of Dorot, before settling in the kibbutz of Yad Hanna in 1951 and participating in its development. He would live there for the rest of his life. In the beginning, the living conditions were rudimentary, and the dangers and challenges were numerous.

For nearly three decades, Jürgen lived his life without knowing what had happened to his loved ones. He would learn this three decades later, thanks to an initiative by Aktion Sühnezeichen. His parents were deported to Auschwitz on December 9, 1942, and were sent directly to the gas chambers upon arrival. His maternal grandmother perished in the Theresienstadt concentration camp. Walter's father was murdered near Riga, Latvia.

He returned to Auschwitz for the first time in 1965. As a member of the International Auschwitz Committee, he was invited to its first general assembly. There, he met other survivors and became friends with some of them, including the Belgian resistance fighter Paul Halter. Becoming fully aware of the enormity of the crime, the miracle of survival, and the responsibility he had to finally speak out, he took part in several commemorations in Germany and Poland in the following decades, sharing his story, particularly with groups of schoolchildren.

He died in Yad Hana on February 16, 2018.
