= Maria Lowenstein =

American artist (1894–1982)

Maria Lowenstein (April 4, 1894 – October 29, 1982) was an American artist.

== Life ==
Lowenstein was born Maria Lilli Margarete Baetge in Estonia. In 1914 in Helsinki, she married architect Erich Steinberg, by whom she had a daughter, Karin, (1915-2014). After fleeing from the tumult of the Russian Revolution, Maria moved to Berlin, where her husband, Erich Steinberg, died in 1920. In 1925, Maria married the Jewish German dermatologist Max Loewenstein; their son, Henry, was born that same year. Among the friends of Max and Maria was the composer Kurt Weill.

Having previously studied at the Hermitage Museum in St. Petersburg, Maria refined her artistic talents at the Institute of Fine Arts in Berlin.

Although she saw her son to safety in 1938 during the Kindertransport, she and her husband and daughter stayed in Berlin during the war, where she was involved in the Rosenstrasse protests of wives of Jewish men. Lowenstein emigrated to the United States in 1946 and settled first in Williamsport, Pennsylvania, where one of her students was Barrie Karp. Max Loewenstein died in 1948. Later, Maria settled in Denver where her son, Henry (1925-2014), became prominent on the theatre scene as a producer and set designer.
