= Lippmann Hirsch Löwenstein =

German Hebrew scholar (1809–1848)

- Born: December 12, 1809; Schwäbisch Hall, Kingdom of Württemberg
- Died: November 1848 (aged 38); Rödelheim, Free City of Frankfurt, German Confederation
- Education: University of Heidelberg
- Writing career
- Language: German

Lippmann Hirsch Löwenstein (Yiddish: ליפמאַן הירש לאֶווענשטיין; 12 December 1809 – November 1848) was a German Hebrew scholar. He was reviser in the publishing-house of Isaac Lehrberger at Rödelheim, which office was afterward held by Seligman Baer. He was expelled from Frankfurt for revolutionary activities in May 1848.

== Publications ==
- Die Proverbien Salomos. 880-02Mishle Shelomoh. Frankfurt: S. Schmerber. 1838. hdl:2027/hvd.ah5ij9. The Book of Proverbs, edited from manuscripts, with a Hebrew commentary and a German metrical translation.
- Kol Bokhim. Frankfurt: s.n. 1838. hdl:2027/hvd.hw5lkr. The Book of Lamentations, with a Hebrew commentary and a German metrical translation, to which he added various kinnot introduced into the liturgy of the Synagogue.
- Damascia: die Judenverfolgung zu Damascus und Ihre Wirkung auf die Öffentliche Meinung. Rödelheim: J. Lehrberger. 1840. hdl:2027/hvd.ah56zq. 2nd ed. 1841.
- Mizmor le-Todah. Rödelheim. 1841. An ode addressed to Moses Montefiore on his return from the Orient.
- Überzeugungen eines Israeliten gegenüber dem Proselytenthum: Erwiederung auf die Schrift des Herrn W. B. Fränkel. Überzeugnungen eines Israeliten gegenüber dem Proselytenthum. Rödelheim: J. Lehrberger. 1842. hdl:2027/hvd.hwms9z.
- Denkschrift an die Herren Rabbinen und Freunde der hebräischen Literatur. Rödelheim: s.n. 1842.
- Stimmen berühmter Christen über den Damaszener Blut-prozess. Rödelheim: J. Lehrberger. 1843. hdl:2027/osu.32435004579660.
- Die fünf Bücher Mosche's. Vol. 1–2. Rödelheim: J. Lehrberger. 1848. The Pentateuch with Targum Onkelos, Rashi's commentary, and an explanation of the French words used by Rashi.
