= Vladimir Levenshtein =

Russian mathematician (1935–2017)

- Born: Vladimir Iosifovich Levenshtein; 20 May 1935; Moscow, USSR
- Died: 6 September 2017 (aged 82)
- Citizenship: Russia
- Education: Moscow State University
- Known for: Levenshtein distance Levenshtein automaton Levenshtein coding
- Awards: IEEE Richard W. Hamming Medal (2006)
- Scientific career
- Fields: Mathematics
- Workplaces: Keldysh Institute of Applied Mathematics

Vladimir Iosifovich Levenshtein (Russian: Влади́мир Ио́сифович Левенште́йн, IPA: [vlɐˈdʲimʲɪr‿ɨˈosʲɪfəvʲɪtɕ lʲɪvʲɪnˈʂtɛjn]; 20 May 1935 – 6 September 2017) was a Russian and Soviet scientist who did research in information theory, error-correcting codes, and combinatorial design. Among other contributions, he is known for the Levenshtein distance and a Levenshtein algorithm, which he developed in 1965.

He graduated from the Department of Mathematics and Mechanics of Moscow State University in 1958 and worked at the Keldysh Institute of Applied Mathematics in Moscow ever since. He was a fellow of the IEEE Information Theory Society.

He received the IEEE Richard W. Hamming Medal in 2006, for "contributions to the theory of error-correcting codes and information theory, including the Levenshtein distance".

== Life ==
Levenshtein graduated from Moscow State University in 1958, where he studied in the faculty of Mechanics and Mathematics. He was a member of the student Komsomol organization and was in charge of university preparations for the 6th World Festival of Youth and Students.

After graduation, he worked at the M.V Keldysh Institute of Applied Mathematics.

== Publications ==
- Levenshtein, V. I. (1965), "Binary codes capable of correcting deletions, insertions, and reversals.", Doklady Akademii Nauk SSSR, 163 (4): 845–848
- Delsarte, P.; Levenshtein, V. I. (1998), "Association schemes and coding theory", IEEE Transactions on Information Theory, 44 (6): 2477–2504, Bibcode:1998ITIT...44.2477D, doi:10.1109/18.720545
- V.I. Levenshtein (1960), "On a class of systematic codes", Doklady Akademii Nauk SSSR, 131 (5): 1011–1014
- V.I. Levenshtein, Application of Hadamard matrices to a problem in coding theory, Problems of Cybernetics, vol. 5, GIFML, Moscow, 1961, 125–136.
- V.I. Levenshtein (1961), "Certain properties of code systems", Doklady Akademii Nauk SSSR, 140 (6): 1274–1277
- V.I. Levenshtein (1961), "Self-adaptive automata for decoding messages", Doklady Akademii Nauk SSSR, 141 (6): 1320–1323
- V.I. Levenshtein (1962), "On the inversion of finite automata", Doklady Akademii Nauk SSSR, 147 (6): 1300–1303
- V.I. Levenshtein, On the stable extension of finite automata, Problems of Cybernetics, vol. 10, GIFML, Moscow, 1963, 281–286.
- V.I. Levenshtein, On some coding systems and self-tuning machines for decoding messages, Problems of Cybernetics, vol. 11, GIFML, Moscow, 1964, 63–121.
- V.I. Levenshtein, Decoding automata invariant with respect to the initial state, Problems of Cybernetics, vol. 12, GIFML, Moscow, 1964, 125–136.
- V.I. Levenshtein (1965), "Binary codes with correction for deletions and insertions of the symbol 1", Problemy Peredachi Informatsii, 1 (1): 12–25
- V.I. Levenshtein (1965), "On a Method of Solving the Problem of Synchronizing a Chain of Automata in Minimal Time", Problemy Peredachi Informatsii, 1 (4): 20–32
- V.I. Levenshtein, Binary codes providing synchronization and correction of errors, Abstracts of short scientific reports of the International Congress of Mathematicians, Section 13, Moscow, 1966, 24.
- V.I. Levenshtein, Asymptotically optimal binary code with correction of occurrences of one or two adjacent characters, Problems of Cybernetics, vol. 19, Science, Moscow, 1967, 293–298.
- V.I. Levenshtein, On the redundancy and deceleration of separable coding of natural numbers, Problems of Cybernetics, vol. 20, Nauka, Moscow, 1968, 173–179.
- V.I. Levenshtein (1968), "On the Synchronization of Two-Way Networks of Automata", Problemy Peredachi Informatsii, 4 (4): 49–62
- V.I. Levenshtein (1969), "Bounds for Codes Ensuring Error Correction and Synchronization", Problemy Peredachi Informatsii, 5 (2): 3–13
- V.I. Levenshtein (1970), "On the Maximum Number of Words in Codes without Overlapping", Problemy Peredachi Informatsii, 6 (4): 88–90
- V.I. Levenshtein (1971), "One Method of Constructing Quasilinear Codes Providing Synchronization in the Presence of Errors", Problemy Peredachi Informatsii, 7 (3): 30–40
- V.I. Levenshtein (1971), "Upper-Bound Estimates for Fixed-Weight Codes", Problemy Peredachi Informatsii, 7 (4): 3–12
- V.I. Levenshtein (1974), "Minimum Redundancy of Binary Error-Correcting Codes", Problemy Peredachi Informatsii, 10 (2): 26–42
- V.I. Levenshtein, Elements of coding theory, In the book. Discrete mathematics and mathematical questions of cybernetics, Nauka, Moscow, 1974, 207–305.
- V.I. Levenshtein (1975), "Maximal packing density of n-dimensional Euclidean space with equal balls", Matematicheskie Zametki, 18 (2): 301–311.
- VI Levenshtein, Methods for obtaining bounds in metric problems of coding theory, Proc. of the 1975 IEEE-USSR Joint Workshop on Information Theory, New York, 1976, 126–143.
- V.I. Levenshtein (1977), "Bounds on the Probability of Undetected Error", Problemy Peredachi Informacii, 13 (1): 3–18
- G.A. Kabatiansky; V.I. Levenshtein (1978), "On Bounds for Packings on a Sphere and in Space", Problemy Peredachi Informatsii, 14 (1): 3–25
- V.I. Levenshtein, On the choice of polynomials for obtaining boundaries in packaging problems, VII All-Union Conference on the Theory of Coding and Information Transfer, Part II, Moscow - Vilnius, 1978, 103–108.
- V.I. Levenshtein (1979), "On boundaries for packings in n-dimensional Euclidean space", Doklady Akademii Nauk SSSR, 245 (6): 1299–1303
- V.I. Levenshtein (1982), "Bounds of the maximal capacity of a code with a limited scalar product modulus", Doklady Akademii Nauk SSSR, 263 (6): 1303–1308
- V.I. Levenshtein, Borders for packaging of metric spaces and some of their applications, Problems of cybernetics, vol. 40, Science, Moscow, 1983, 43–110.
- VI Levenshtein, Packing of polynomial metric spaces, Third International Workshop on Information Theory, Convolutional codes; multi-user communication, Sochi, 1987, 271–274.
- V.I. Levenshtein (1989), "On the Straight-Line Bound for the Undetected Error Exponent", Problemy Peredachi Informatsii, 25 (1): 33–37
- VI Levenshtein, Perfect deletion-correcting codes as combinatorial designs, Proc. of the Second International Workshop: Algebraic and Combinatorial Coding Theory, Leningrad, USSR, 1990, 137–140.
- V.I. Levenshtein (1991), "Perfect codes in the metric of deletions and insertions", Diskretnaya Matematika, 3 (1): 3–20.
- VI Levenshtein, Designs as maximum codes in polynomial metric spaces, Acta Applicandae Mathematicae, vol. 29 (1992), 1-82.
- VI Levenshtein, Bounds for self-complementary codes and their applications, in Eurocode-92. CISM Courses and Lectures, vol. 339. Springer-Verlag, Wien-New-York, 1993, 159–171.
- VI Levenshtein, Bounds for codes as solutions of extremum problems for systems of orthogonal polynomials, Applied Algebra, Algebraic Algorithms and Error-Correcting Codes, Lectures Notes in Computer Science, vol. 673, Springer-Verlag, 1993, 25–42.
- V.I. Levenshtein; A.J.H. Vinck (1993), "Perfect (d,k)-codes capable of correcting single peak-shifts", IEEE Transactions on Information Theory, 39 (2), IEEE: 656–662, Bibcode:1993ITIT...39..656L, doi:10.1109/18.212300
- V.I. Levenshtein (1993), "Packing and Decomposition Problems for Polynomial Association Schemes", European Journal of Combinatorics, 14 (5): 461–477, doi:10.1006/eujc.1993.1049
- T. Ericson and VI Levenshtein, Superimposed codes in the Hamming space, IEEE Trans. Inform. Theory, vol. 40, no. 6 (1994), 1882–1893.
- G. Fasekas and VI Levenshtein, On upper bounds for code distance and covering radius of designs in polynomial metric spaces, J. Combin. Th. Ser. A, vol. 70, no. 2 (1995), 267–288.
- T. Helleseth, T. Klove, VI Levenshtein, and O. Ytrehus, Bounds on the minimum support weights, IEEE Trans. Inform. Theory, vol. 41, no. 2 (1995), 432–440.
- VI Levenshtein, Krawtchouk polynomials and universal bounds for codes and designs in Hamming spaces, IEEE Trans. Inform. Theory, vol. 41, no. 5 (1995), 1303–1321.
- V.I. Levenshtein (1995), "A Simple Proof of the Basic Inequalities for the Fundamental Parameters of Codes in Polynomial Relationship Schemes", Problemy Peredachi Informatsii, 31 (4): 37–50.
- VI Levenshtein, Reconstructing binary sequences by the minimum number of their subsequences or supersequences of a given length. Proceedings of Fifth Intern. Workshop on Algebr. and Combin. Coding Theory, Sozopol, Bulgaria, June 1–7, 1996, 176–183.
- VI Levenshtein, Lower bounds on crosscorrelation of codes. Proceedings of IEEE Fourth Intern. Symp on Spread Spectrum Techniques and Appl., Mainz, Germany, September 22–25, 1996, 657–661.
- VI Levenshtein, Split orthogonal arrays and maximum independent resilient systems of functions, Designs, Codes and Cryptography, vol. 12, no. 2 (1997), 131–160.
- T. Helleseth, T. Klove, and VI Levenshtein, On the information function of an error-correcting code, IEEE Trans. Inform. Theory, vol. 43, no. 2 (1997), pp. 549–557.
- V.I. Levenshtein (1997), "Reconstruction of objects from the minimum number of distorted patterns", Doklady Akademii Nauk SSSR, 354 (5): 593–596
- P. Delsarte and VI Levenshtein, Association schemes and coding theory, IEEE Trans. Inform. Theory, vol. 44, no. 6 (1998), 2477–2504.
- VI Levenshtein, Universal bounds for codes and designs, in Handbook of Coding Theory, VS Pless and WC Huffman, Eds., Amsterdam: Elsevier, vol. 1, 499–648, 1998.
- VI Levenshtein, On designs in compact metric spaces and a universal bound on their size, Discrete Mathematics, vol. 192 (1998), 251–271.
- VI Levenshtein, On the maximum T-wise independent systems of Boolean functions, Workshop on Coding and Cryptography, Paris, France, 1999, 367–370.
- VI Levenshtein, Equivalence of Delsarte's bounds for codes and designs in symmetric association schemes and some applications, Discrete Mathematics, vol. 197/198 (1999), 515–536.
- VI Levenshtein, New lower bounds on aperiodic crosscorrelation of binary codes, IEEE Trans. Inform. Theory, vol. 45, no. 1 (1999), 284–288.
- IN AND. Levenshtein, On designs in continuous unit cubes, Proceedings of the IV International Conference: Discrete models in the theory of control systems, Moscow State University, MAKS Press, 2000, 62–64.
- VI Levenshtein, Efficient reconstruction of sequences, IEEE Trans. Inform. Theory, vol. 47, no. 1 (2001), 2-22.
- VI Levenshtein, Efficient reconstruction of sequences from their subsequences or supersequences, Journal of Combin. Theory, Ser. A, vol. 93, no. 2 (2001), 310–332.
- T. Berger and VI Levenshtein, Asymptotical efficiency of two-stage testing, IEEE Trans. Inform. Theory, vol. 48, no. 7 (2002), 1741–1749.
- T. Berger and VI Levenshtein, Application of cover-free codes and combinatorial designs to two-stage testing, Discrete Applied Mathematics.
- T. Helleseth, T. Klove and VI Levenshtein, Hypercubic 4 and 5-designs from double-error-correcting BCH codes, Designs, Codes and Cryptography.
- VI Levenshtein, A universal bound for a covering in regular posets and its application to pool testing, Discrete Mathematics.
- Helleseth, Tor; Kløve, Torleiv; Levenshtein, Vladimir (2005), "Error-correction capability of binary linear codes", IEEE Transactions on Information Theory, 51 (4), IEEE: 1408–1423, Bibcode:2005ITIT...51.1408H, doi:10.1109/TIT.2005.844080, S2CID 17840890
- VI Levenshtein, Combinatorial problems motivated by comma-free codes, Discrete Mathematics.

== See also ==
- Association scheme
- Bose–Mesner algebra
- Levenshtein automaton
- Levenshtein coding
