= Levenshtein coding =

Universal coding

Levenshtein coding is a universal code encoding the non-negative integers developed by Vladimir Levenshtein.

== Encoding ==
The code of zero is "0"; to code a positive number:

1. Initialize the step count variable C to 1.
2. Write the binary representation of the number without the leading "1" to the beginning of the code.
3. Let M be the number of bits written in step 2.
4. If M is not 0, increment C, repeat from step 2 with M as the new number.
5. Write C "1" bits and a "0" to the beginning of the code.

The code begins:

Number	Encoding	Implied probability
0	0	1/2
1	10	1/4
2	110 0	1/16
3	110 1	1/16
4	1110 0 00	1/128
5	1110 0 01	1/128
6	1110 0 10	1/128
7	1110 0 11	1/128
8	1110 1 000	1/256
9	1110 1 001	1/256
10	1110 1 010	1/256
11	1110 1 011	1/256
12	1110 1 100	1/256
13	1110 1 101	1/256
14	1110 1 110	1/256
15	1110 1 111	1/256
16	11110 0 00 0000	1/4096
17	11110 0 00 0001	1/4096

To decode a Levenshtein-coded integer:

1. Count the number of "1" bits until a "0" is encountered.
2. If the count is zero, the value is zero, otherwise
3. Discard the "1" bits just counted and the first "0" encountered
4. Start with a variable N, set it to a value of 1 and repeat count minus 1 times:
5. Read N bits (and remove them from the encoded integer), prepend "1", assign the resulting value to N

The Levenshtein code of a positive integer is always one bit longer than the Elias omega code of that integer. However, there is a Levenshtein code for zero, whereas Elias omega coding would require the numbers to be shifted so that a zero is represented by the code for one instead.

== Example code ==
=== Encoding ===
void levenshteinEncode(char* source, char* dest)
{
    IntReader intreader(source);
    BitWriter bitwriter(dest);
    while (intreader.hasLeft())
    {
        int num = intreader.getInt();
        if (num == 0)
            bitwriter.outputBit(0);
        else
        {
            int c = 0;
            BitStack bits;
            do {
                int m = 0;
                for (int temp = num; temp > 1; temp>>=1)  // calculate floor(log2(num))
                    ++m;
                for (int i=0; i < m; ++i)
                    bits.pushBit((num >> i) & 1);
                num = m;
                ++c;
            } while (num > 0);
            for (int i=0; i < c; ++i)
                bitwriter.outputBit(1);
            bitwriter.outputBit(0);
            while (bits.length() > 0)
                bitwriter.outputBit(bits.popBit());
        }
    }
}

=== Decoding ===
void levenshteinDecode(char* source, char* dest)
{
    BitReader bitreader(source);
    IntWriter intwriter(dest);
    while (bitreader.hasLeft())
    {
        int n = 0;
        while (bitreader.inputBit())     // potentially dangerous with malformed files.
            ++n;
        int num;
        if (n == 0)
            num = 0;
        else
        {
            num = 1;
            for (int i = 0; i < n-1; ++i)
            {
                int val = 1;
                for (int j = 0; j < num; ++j)
                    val = (val << 1) | bitreader.inputBit();
                num = val;
            }
        }
        intwriter.putInt(num);           // write out the value
    }
    bitreader.close();
    intwriter.close();
}

== See also ==
- Elias omega coding
- Iterated logarithm
