= Elias gamma coding =

Universal encoding scheme for positive integers

Elias $\gamma$ code or Elias gamma code is a universal code encoding positive integers developed by Peter Elias. It is used most commonly when coding integers whose upper bound cannot be determined beforehand.

== Encoding ==
To code a number x ≥ 1:

1. Let $N = \lfloor \log_2 x \rfloor$ be the highest power of 2 it contains, so 2^{N} ≤ x < 2^{N+1}.
2. Write out $N$ zero bits, then
3. Append the binary form of $x$, an $(N+1)$-bit binary number.

An equivalent way to express the same process:

1. Encode $N$ in unary; that is, as $N$ zeroes followed by a one.
2. Append the remaining $N$ binary digits of $x$ to this representation of $N$.

To represent a number $x$, Elias gamma (γ) uses $2 \lfloor \log_2(x) \rfloor + 1$ bits.

The code begins (the implied probability distribution for the code is added for clarity):

Number	Binary	γ encoding	Implied probability
1 = 2^{0} + 0	1	1	1/2
2 = 2^{1} + 0	1 0	0 1 0	1/8
3 = 2^{1} + 1	1 1	0 1 1	1/8
4 = 2^{2} + 0	1 00	00 1 00	1/32
5 = 2^{2} + 1	1 01	00 1 01	1/32
6 = 2^{2} + 2	1 10	00 1 10	1/32
7 = 2^{2} + 3	1 11	00 1 11	1/32
8 = 2^{3} + 0	1 000	000 1 000	1/128
9 = 2^{3} + 1	1 001	000 1 001	1/128
10 = 2^{3} + 2	1 010	000 1 010	1/128
11 = 2^{3} + 3	1 011	000 1 011	1/128
12 = 2^{3} + 4	1 100	000 1 100	1/128
13 = 2^{3} + 5	1 101	000 1 101	1/128
14 = 2^{3} + 6	1 110	000 1 110	1/128
15 = 2^{3} + 7	1 111	000 1 111	1/128
16 = 2^{4} + 0	1 0000	0000 1 0000	1/512
17 = 2^{4} + 1	1 0001	0000 1 0001	1/512

== Decoding ==
To decode an Elias gamma-coded integer:

1. Read and count 0s from the stream until you reach the first 1. Call this count of zeroes N.
2. Considering the one that was reached to be the first digit of the integer, with a value of 2^{N}, read the remaining N digits of the integer.

== Uses ==
Gamma coding is used in applications where the largest encoded value is not known ahead of time, or to compress data in which small values are much more frequent than large values.

Gamma coding can be more size efficient in those situations. For example, note that, in the table above, if a fixed 8-bit size is chosen to store a small number like the number 5, the resulting binary would be 00000101, while the γ-encoding variable-bit version would be 00 1 01, needing 3 bits fewer. On the contrary, bigger values, like 254 stored in fixed 8-bit size, would be 11111110 while the γ-encoding variable-bit version would be 0000000 1 1111110, needing 7 extra bits.

Gamma coding is a building block in the Elias delta code.

== Generalizations ==
Gamma coding does not code zero or negative integers. One way of handling zero is to add 1 before coding and then subtract 1 after decoding. Another way is to prefix each nonzero code with a 1 and then code zero as a single 0.

One way to code all integers is to set up a bijection, mapping integers (0, −1, 1, −2, 2, −3, 3, ...) to (1, 2, 3, 4, 5, 6, 7, ...) before coding. In software, this is most easily done by mapping non-negative inputs to odd outputs, and negative inputs to even outputs, so the least-significant bit becomes an inverted sign bit:
$$\begin{cases}
x \mapsto 2x+1 & \mathrm{when~} x \geq 0 \\
x \mapsto -2x  & \mathrm{when~} x < 0 \\
\end{cases}$$

Exponential-Golomb coding generalizes the gamma code to integers with a "flatter" power-law distribution, just as Golomb coding generalizes the unary code. It involves dividing the number by a positive divisor, commonly a power of 2, writing the gamma code for one more than the quotient, and writing out the remainder in an ordinary binary code.

== Code length ==
The code lengths for Elias gamma coding are:

1, 3, 3, 5, 5, 5, 5, 7, 7, 7, 7, 7, 7, 7, 7, 9, 9, 9, 9, 9, 9, 9, 9, 9, 9, 9, 9, 9, 9, 9, 9, 11, … (sequence A129972 in the OEIS).

== See also ==
- Elias delta (δ) coding – Universal code encoding positive integers
- Elias omega (ω) coding – Universal code encoding positive integers
- Posit (number format) – Variant of floating-point numbers in computers
