= Jakob Löwenstein =

German author and rabbi

Rabbi Jakob Löwenstein

Personal life
- Born: August 17, 1799 Bruchsal
- Died: July 27, 1869 (aged 69) Tauberbischofsheim

Religious life
- Religion: Judaism

Jakob Koppel Löwenstein (also Moshe Yaakov Kopel HaLevi Lewenstein; August 17, 1799, in Bruchsal – July 27, 1869, in Tauberbischofsheim) was a German rabbi and writer in Baden.

== Biography ==
Jakob Löwenstein was the son of Joseph Löwenstein. He studied first at the Yeshiva in Bruchsal, then from 1813 in Karlsruhe under Ascher Löw and Aron Ettlinger (father of Jacob Ettlinger, friend of Jakob Löwenstein from his youth), from 1816 in Mainz under Abraham Naftali Hertz Scheuer, from 1820 in Hanau under Moses (Moshe Tuvia) Sontheim, and from 1825 in Würzburg under Abraham Bing. In 1825 and 1826 he studied secular studies at the University of Würzburg.

In 1829 Löwenstein married Regina (Rechel) Ettlinger (born 1806 in Karlsruhe; died 1880). Together they had thirteen children, of which the following eleven were born in Gailingen am Hochrhein: Adelheid (born 26 May 1830), Hannchen (born 24 May 1831), Minette (born 20 August 1832; died 10 April 1835), Isaac (born 5 October 1834), Rebekka (born 16 April 1836), Samuel (born 17 January 1838), Babette (born 29 December 1839), Mirjam (born 31 December 1841), Leopold (1843–1923), Judith (born 16 September 1845) and Joseph (born 29 December 1847).

From 1829 to 1851 he was district rabbi in Gailingen. He was a representative of the so-called neo-orthodoxy. In July 1852 he took over the district rabbinate in Tauberbischofsheim, a position he held until his death.

== Works ==
Löwenstein authored Menorah Tehorah (in German) in opposition of the reformists. The book was printed in Schaffhausen in 1835.
