= Louis Lowenstein (medicine) =

American medical researcher (1908–1968)

Louis Lowenstein (1908 – March 23, 1968) was an American-born Canadian medical researcher who made significant contributions in hematology and immunology.

== Biography ==
Lowenstein was born in Nashville, Tennessee, in 1908. As a child in Nashville, he was accomplished as a violinist and tennis player. He received a bachelor's degree from Vanderbilt University and a medical degree from Vanderbilt's medical school. In 1937, after additional training at Vanderbilt and Ohio State University, he joined the faculty of the McGill University medical school and the staff of the Royal Victoria Hospital in Montreal, Quebec. He remained at McGill for the rest of his professional career, except for service in the Royal Canadian Air Force during World War II.

Lowenstein's long-term studies of anemia and malnutrition in pregnancy revealed that an unexpectedly large number of pregnant women in North America were significantly deficient in folate. He also made important contributions to the study and understanding of megaloblastic anemias, iron deficiency, hemolytic disease of newborn infants, blood coagulation, polycythemia, effects of drugs and hormones on blood, blastogenesis, and histocompatibility.

He died suddenly from myocardial infarction on March 23, 1968, while in Puerto Rico.
