= Louis Lowenstein (lawyer) =

American lawyer (1925–2009)

Louis Lowenstein (June 13, 1925 – April 18, 2009) was an American attorney. He was a founding partner of Kramer Levin (at the time known as Kramer, Lowenstein, Nessen & Kamin) now one of New York City's corporate law firms; president of Supermarkets General, a supermarket conglomerate whose operating subsidiary was known as Pathmark; professor at Columbia University School of Law; and a leading critic of the U.S. financial industry.

He graduated with a B.S. from Columbia Business School in 1947, and a LL.B. from Columbia Law School in 1953.

He was the author of several books, including:

- What’s Wrong With Wall Street: Short Term Gain and the Absentee Shareholder, Addison-Wesley, 1988
- Sense and Nonsense in Corporate Finance, 1991
- The Investor’s Dilemma: How Mutual Funds Are Betraying Your Trust and What to Do About It, Wiley, 2008

He also coedited and contributed to Knights, Raiders, and Targets: The Impact of the Hostile Takeover, published by Oxford University Press in 1988.

His son, Roger Lowenstein, is a financial journalist.
