= Daniel H. Lowenstein (physician) =

American neurologist

- Education: University of Colorado; Pennsylvania State University; Harvard Medical School
- Scientific career
- Fields: Neurology
- Workplaces: University of California, San Francisco

Daniel H. Lowenstein is an American neurologist who is professor of neurology and former executive vice chancellor and provost at the University of California, San Francisco (UCSF). He is known for his work in the field of epilepsy, including laboratory-based and clinical research, the clinical care of patients with epilepsy, and advocacy for the needs of patients and family members living with epilepsy. He was the originator of the “Academy of Medical Educators” concept, and is the recipient of teaching awards both at UCSF and nationally. He has served as the dean for medical education at Harvard Medical School, and as president of the American Epilepsy Society. In 2017, he was elected to the National Academy of Medicine in recognition of his contributions to American medicine.

== Education and academic career ==
Lowenstein graduated with a B.A. in mathematics from the University of Colorado (1973), obtained an M.S. degree in man-environment relations from Pennsylvania State University (1978), and received his M.D. from Harvard Medical School in 1983. At the University of California, San Francisco (UCSF), he completed an internship in pediatrics (1983–84), a residency in neurology (1984–87), a two-year fellowship in Stanley Prusiner's Laboratory, and then became a faculty member at UCSF in the Department of Neurology where, in 1998, he was named the Robert B. and Ellinor Aird Professor of Neurology. While at UCSF, he established the UCSF Epilepsy Research Laboratory, and has served as co-chair for the Chancellor's Steering Committee on Diversity, and chair of the “Blue Sky” Curriculum Design Task Force that helped design the new medical school curriculum.

From 2000 to 2003, Lowenstein was dean for medical education at Harvard Medical School (HMS). While there, he oversaw a re-organization of curricular governance, the creation of a new educational technology program, and the establishment of the HMS Academy. In 2003, he returned to UCSF as Division Chief of the UCSF Epilepsy Center, and director of the School of Medicine's student research training programs. In February 2015, Chancellor Sam Hawgood tapped the physician-scientist to be second-in-command as the Executive Vice Chancellor and Provost for the university. In this role, Lowenstein led UCSF's research enterprise and academic program, consisting of four professional schools and a Graduate Division. He stepped down from this position in 2023, returning to his work as a teacher and researcher, and attending physician at San Francisco General Hospital.

== Research ==
Lowenstein's clinical and research interests include the genetic factors thought to underlie many forms of epilepsies (idiopathic epilepsies) and the management and treatment of patients with status epilepticus (unusually prolonged seizures).

His laboratory studies (carried out from 1989 to 2002) have addressed the fundamental mechanisms of neuronal network remodeling that occur during epileptogenesis, the process in which a normal network transforms into a hyperexcitable network capable of producing or relaying seizure activity. The main efforts of his research group focused on the various forms of cellular reorganization that are observed in humans with temporal lobe epilepsy, and the parallels between reorganization in the adult nervous system and normal developmental processes. Important findings by his team included the observation of selective neuronal loss in the setting of traumatic brain injury, the discovery that seizure activity in an adult model of temporal lobe epilepsy causes a marked increase in the birth of hippocampal neurons (with post-doc Jack Parent), and the recognition that numerous molecules responsible for normal development are also expressed in this same brain region in the adult.

In 2002, Lowenstein turned his attention toward questions related to the genetic basis of common forms of human epilepsy. Working with colleagues from throughout the world, he helped create the Epilepsy Phenome/Genome Project (EPGP), an international, multi-institutional, collaborative study that aimed to collect detailed phenotype data on 5,250 subjects with specific forms of epilepsy, with the goal of finding the genetic determinants of their disease through whole exome and whole genome sequencing. EPGP enrolled over 4,000 participants and, at the time, compiled the most extensive and detailed phenotype dataset in the history of epilepsy research. In 2011, Lowenstein and colleagues were successful in receiving funding for a new NINDS Epilepsy Center Without Walls, the “Epi4K: Gene Discovery in 4,000 Epilepsy Genomes” which had as one of its goals the analysis of the EPGP cohorts.

The first major findings of the collaborative effort between EPGP and Epi4K, which demonstrated the role of de novo mutations as the cause of many patients with epileptic encephalopathy, appeared in a 2013 issue of Nature. Numerous findings have since been published based on the combined work of EPGP and Epi4K, including a paper in Lancet Neurology describing the role of ultra-rare variants in the common epilepsies. In addition, Lowenstein has helped oversee the phenotyping efforts of the International League Against Epilepsy (ILAE) Consortium on Complex Epilepsies, which completed a meta-analysis of available genotype data on approximately 15,000 epilepsy patients. He is one of the leaders of Epi25, an international effort that succeeded in completing whole exome and whole genome sequencing on over 20,000 patients with epilepsy in collaboration with the Broad Institute and other partner institutions.

Lowenstein's clinical research related to status epilepticus began with retrospective studies of patients admitted to San Francisco General Hospital, as well as a highly cited article suggesting a revision of the definition of status epilepticus. In the 1990s, he was the Principal Investigator of a prospective, multi-centered, NINDS-sponsored clinical trial looking at the potential benefits of active treatment of patients in status epilepticus in the pre-hospital setting. This five-year study, completed in 1999, helped define the optimal therapy for these patients nationally. From 2005 to 2015, Lowenstein served as Co-Principal Investigator and member of the Neurological Emergency Treatment Trials (NETT) Clinical Coordinating Center, which oversaw a network of academic centers and affiliated hospitals in the U.S. carrying out numerous clinical trials related to acute neurological disease. As part of this effort, he was Co-Principal Investigator with Dr. Robert Silbergleit for the Rapid Anticonvulsant Medications Prior to Arrival Trial (RAMPART) study, where he was involved in the design, oversight and implementation of a trial that unambiguously demonstrated the benefits of the administration of intramuscular midazolam in this setting.

RAMPART was selected as the “2013 Clinical Trial of the Year” by the Society for Clinical Trials. Lowenstein subsequently worked with colleagues in the field to design and implement the Established Status Epilepticus Treatment Trial (ESETT), a NINDS-funded, randomized, prospective study of fos-phenytoin, valproate or levetiracetam in the treatment of status epilepticus.

== Other accomplishments ==
While chairing the UCSF “Blue Sky” Curriculum Design Task Force in the late 1990s, Lowenstein is credited for coming up with the idea of “The Academy” at UCSF, a new approach for supporting the teaching mission of medical schools. The academy movement now involves many institutions across the U.S. and elesewhere.

During the first White House-initiated Curing Epilepsy conference held in 2000, Lowenstein suggested that members of the epilepsy research community should attempt to capture the field's current 'state of the art' and define a series of goals for the field that could serve as a research agenda. This led to the adoption by the National Institutes of Neurological Disorders and Stroke (NINDS) of the “Epilepsy Research Benchmarks”, a program that has been led by Lowenstein and used by the NINDS and other funding agencies to help prioritize grant opportunities and demonstrate progress to the legislature and the public at-large.

In April 2013, Lowenstein was selected by the students at UCSF to give “The Last Lecture”, where he was asked to respond to the prompt: “If you had but one lecture to give, what would you say?” Lowenstein's hour-long talk to over 700 members of the campus community was organized into four threads: adventure, passion, justice, and joy & sorrow. It was described by observers as “alternately inspiring, hilarious, and profoundly moving”.

== Publications ==
Lowenstein has published over 300 scholarly professional journal articles that include:

- The Epi4K Consortium and the Epilepsy Phenome/Genome Project (2013). "De novo mutations in epileptic encephalopathies". Nature. 501 (7466): 217–221. Bibcode:2013Natur.501..217E. doi:10.1038/nature12439. PMC 3773011. PMID 23934111.
- Stern BJ, Lowenstein DH, Schuh LA (2008). "Neurology education research". Neurology. 70 (11): 876–883. doi:10.1212/01.wnl.0000304745.93585.88. PMID 18332346. S2CID 36327358.
- Lowenstein DH (2007). "Mt. Pumbari, Lhasa, Tibet (photograph)". The New England Journal of Medicine. 356: 1544.
- Irby DM, Cooke M, Lowenstein DH, Richards B (2004). "Structural changes supporting the educational mission". Academic Medicine. 79 (8): 729–736. doi:10.1097/00001888-200408000-00003. PMID 15277127.
- Alldredge BK, Gelb AM, Isaacs SM, Corry MD, Allen F, O Neil N, Gottwald MD, Ulrich S, Neuhaus JM, Segal MR, Lowenstein DH (2001). "Prehospital treatment of status epilepticus: a randomized, controlled trial of paramedic-administered benzodiazepine treatment". The New England Journal of Medicine. 345 (9): 631–637. doi:10.1056/nejmoa002141. PMID 11547716.
- Lowenstein DH, Bleck TP, Macdonald RM (1999). "It's time to revise the definition of status epilepticus". Epilepsia. 40 (1): 120–122. doi:10.1111/j.1528-1157.1999.tb02000.x. hdl:2027.42/65376. PMID 9924914. S2CID 13282212.
- Lowenstein DH, Alldredge BK (1998). "Status epilepticus". The New England Journal of Medicine. 338 (14): 970–6. doi:10.1056/NEJM199804023381407. PMID 9521986.
- Parent J, Yu TW, Leibowitz RT, Geschwind DH, Sloviter RS, Lowenstein DH (1997). "Dentate granule cell neurogenesis is increased by seizures and contributes to aberrant network plasticity in the adult rat hippocampus". The Journal of Neuroscience. 17 (10): 3727–3738. doi:10.1523/JNEUROSCI.17-10-03727.1997. PMC 6573703. PMID 9133393.
- Lowenstein DH, Chan PH, Miles MF (1991). "The stress protein response in cultured neurons: Characterization and evidence for a protective role in excitotoxicity". Neuron. 7 (6). Cell Press: 1053–1060. doi:10.1016/0896-6273(91)90349-5. PMID 1764242. S2CID 21577832.
- Lowenstein DH (1991). "Night passages (poem)". The New England Journal of Medicine. 324: 852. doi:10.1056/nejm199103213241218.
- Lowenstein DH, Massa SM, Rowbotham MC, Collins SD, McKinney HE, Simon RP (1987). "Acute neurologic and psychiatric complications associated with cocaine abuse". American Journal of Medicine. 83 (5): 841–846. doi:10.1016/0002-9343(87)90640-1. PMID 3674091.
