= Daniel H. Lowenstein (attorney) =

American legal scholar

Daniel Hays Lowenstein (born May 10, 1943) is an American expert in election law, serving as an emeritus professor at UCLA Law School.

== Biography ==
Lowenstein graduated from Yale University in 1964 and magna cum laude from Harvard Law School in 1967.

Lowenstein was appointed by California governor Jerry Brown as the first chairman of the California Fair Political Practices Commission in 1974 and was Jerry Brown's Chief Deputy Secretary of State. He was elected to the National Governing Board of Common Cause in 1979 and has been a board member and a vice president of Americans for Nonsmokers' Rights. He is also the co-author of the groundbreaking California Political Reform Act of 1974.

Lowenstein is considered a pioneer in election law teaching and research, and was the founding editor of the Election Law Journal. His work has been widely studied and analyzed.

In addition to his election law scholarship, Lowenstein has published commentary on literary works including Shakespeare's "The Merchant of Venice" and Dickens' "Bleak House." He served for nine years as the chairman of the board of the Interact Theatre Company and is currently on the board of the Odyssey Theatre Ensemble, both in Los Angeles. Lowenstein served as a doctoral dissertation supervisor of Jurij Toplak at University of Maribor.

Since July 1, 2009, Lowenstein has been serving as the first director of UCLA's Center for the Liberal Arts and Free Institutions (CLAFI), which is intended to support teaching, research, and public discussion of the great works and achievements of western civilization.

He is married to Sharon Yagi, who is originally from Watsonville, California. They have two sons, Aaron Lowenstein and Nathan Lowenstein who are both attorneys working in Los Angeles. Aaron is an attorney at Warner Brothers Television and Nathan is a founding partner of Lowenstein & Weatherwax LLP. Sharon has two siblings, Gayle Yagi Gotelli and Randy Yagi.
