= Mechel Scheuer =

German rabbi

Rabbi Mechel Scheuer was a German Orthodox rabbi, born in Frankfurt am Main in 1739 to his father Rabbi David Tebele Scheuer. He led his father's Yeshiva in Mainz as its Rosh Yeshiva during the years 1776 and 1777. In 1778 he became rabbi of Worms and in 1782 was appointed rabbi of Mannheim; then as rabbi of Koblenz where he died in 1810 (27 Shevat 5570 on the Hebrew calendar.)

== Pupils ==
Among his pupils in (1776 - 1777) was the future famed Chasam Sofer who eulogized him as "the teacher of my youth ... who was renowned with his sharpness; was able to "overturn mountains and grind them"; he was an elder and extremely wise ... in the years 5536 (1776) and 5537 (1777) I stood before him while he was Rosh Yeshiva in the holy community of Mainz".
