= Gaspard Monge =

French mathematician (1746–1818)

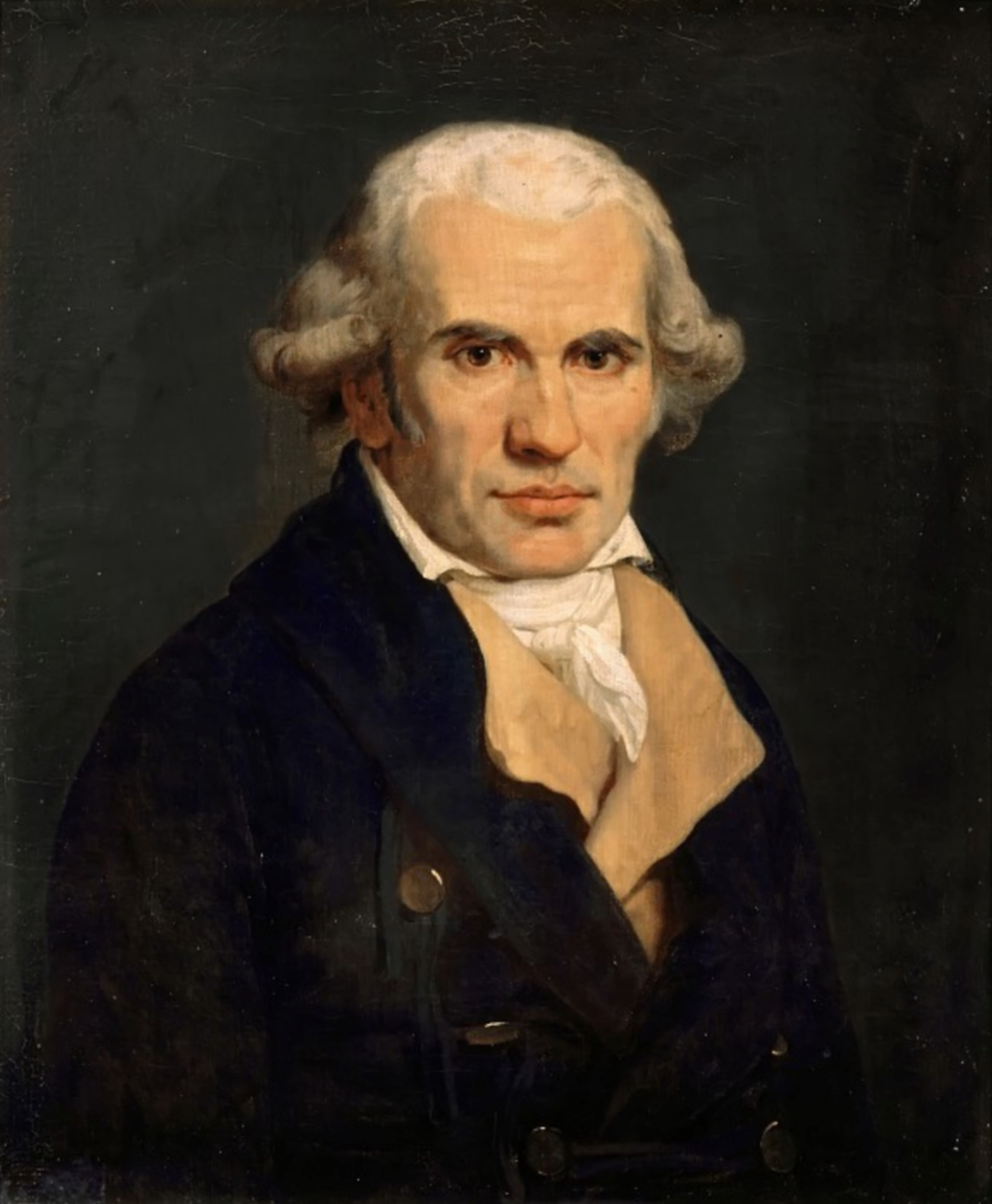
- Born: 9 May 1746; Beaune, Côte-d'Or, Kingdom of France
- Died: 28 July 1818 (aged 72); Paris, Kingdom of France
- Resting place: Père Lachaise Cemetery
- Known for: Descriptive geometry Transportation theory
- Scientific career
- Fields: Mathematics; engineering; education
- Notable students: Jean-Baptiste Biot; Charles Dupin; Sylvestre François Lacroix; Jean-Victor Poncelet

Gaspard Monge, Comte de Péluse (French: [ɡaspaʁ mɔ̃ʒ kɔ̃t də pelyz]; 9 May 1746 – 28 July 1818) was a French mathematician, commonly presented as the inventor of descriptive geometry, (the mathematical basis of) technical drawing, and the father of differential geometry.

He contributed alongside chemist Claude Louis Berthollet, chemist and physician Jean-Antoine Chaptal, and polymath Pierre-Simon Laplace to the establishment of Arts et Métiers ParisTech.

During the French Revolution he served as the Minister of the Marine, and was involved in the reform of the French educational system, helping to found, with Lamblardie and Lazare Carnot, the École Polytechnique, France's most prestigious engineering school.

== Early life ==
Monge was born at Beaune, Côte-d'Or, the son of a merchant. He was educated at the college of the Oratorians at Beaune. In 1762 he went to the Collège de la Trinité at Lyon, where, one year after he had begun studying, he was made a teacher of physics at the age of seventeen.

After finishing his education in 1764 he returned to Beaune, where he made a large-scale plan of the town, inventing the methods of observation and constructing the necessary instruments; the plan was presented to the town, and is still preserved in their library. An officer of engineers who saw it wrote to the commandant of the École Royale du Génie at Mézières, recommending Monge to him and he was given a job as a draftsman. L. T. C. Rolt, an engineer and historian of technology, credited Monge with the birth of engineering drawing. When in the Royal School, he became a member of a Freemasonry, initiated into ″L’Union parfaite″ lodge.

== Career ==
=== 1764–1818 ===
Those studying at the officer school were exclusively drawn from the aristocracy, so he was not allowed admission to the institution itself. His manual skill was highly regarded, but his mathematical skills were not made use of. Nevertheless, he worked on the development of his ideas in his spare time. At this time he came to contact with Charles Bossut, the professor of mathematics at the École Royale du Génie. "I was a thousand times tempted," he said long afterwards, "to tear up my drawings in disgust at the esteem in which they were held, as if I had been good for nothing better."

After a year at the École Royale, Monge was asked to produce a défilement plan for a fortification in such a way as to optimise its defensive arrangement. In military terminology, défilement is "the science of aligning the summits of fortifications in a vertical plane, so as to evade gunfire from a height outside the fortress".

A fort should protect the defenders. That is, from any point on the terrain outside, there cannot be direct line of sight into defending positions inside. This safe space is called the defilade, and could be pictured as follows: Place a lamp at each location where the attacker may fire, then the shadow space cast by the walls is the defilade. The défilement is a kind of defilade, where the attackers may be raised above the ground. This would protect the defenders against artillery placed on raised platforms built during a siege. Defilade and défilement would avoid enfilade.

A particularly dangerous kind of artillery fire is enfilade fire. The top edge of a fort wall is a polygonal line. On each segment, defenders can move. If an attacker can place an artillery on a point along that straight segment, then the attacker can shoot directly along the line, and hit all the defenders on that line segment.

Computing the défilement is a complex problem, since to counter the development of artillery, European forts was becoming increasingly complicated in their geometry, as represented by the star fort. The famous military engineer Vauban proposed a slow and manual process to measure the défilement. Soldiers would be sent to strategically critical positions outside the fort. At each position, they would measure the shape of the polygonal line created by the upper edge of the curtain wall. This creates a sequence of triangles that together create a polygonal dome in space. The space under the polygonal dome would then be the défilement of the walls, within which the defenders are safe from direct lines of sight.

Other than the observational method, there was also an established method for doing this, which involved lengthy calculations that would take a week, but Monge devised a way of solving the problems by using drawings. At first his solution was not accepted, since it had only taken two days, but upon examination the value of the work was recognised, and Monge's exceptional abilities were recognised. The essence of Monge's method was to graphically construct visibility cones. For example, consider a hemisphere H, with a raised point p above H, representing a point on the fortification wall. The visibility cone at p is a cone that is tangent to H and apexed at p. Continuing his researches, Monge began the subject descriptive geometry, which was kept as a French military secret for years.

After Bossut left the École Royale du Génie, Monge took his place in January 1769, and in 1770 he was also appointed instructor in experimental physics.

In 1777, Monge married Cathérine Huart, who owned a forge. This led Monge to develop an interest in metallurgy. In 1780 he became a member of the French Academy of Sciences; his friendship with chemist C. L. Berthollet began at this time. In 1783, after leaving Mézières, he was, on the death of É. Bézout, appointed examiner of naval candidates. Although pressed by the minister to prepare a complete course of mathematics, he declined to do so on the grounds that this would deprive Mme Bézout of her only income, that from the sale of the textbooks written by her late husband. In 1786 he wrote and published his Traité élémentaire de la statique.

=== 1789–1818 ===
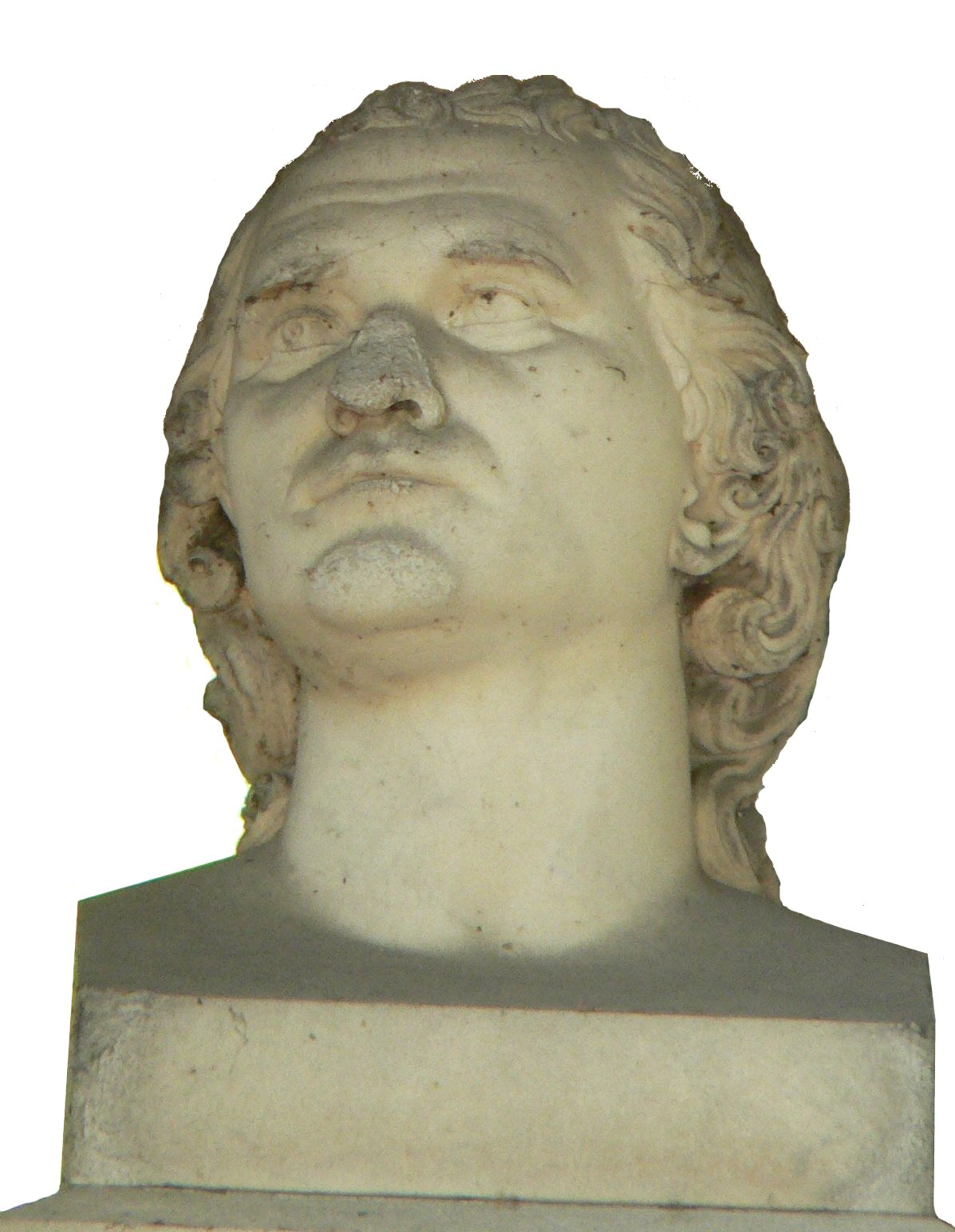
Monge's bust in Le Père Lachaise Cemetery in Paris

The French Revolution completely changed the course of Monge's career. He was a strong supporter of the Revolution, and in 1792, on the creation by the Legislative Assembly of an executive council, Monge accepted the office of Minister of the Navy, and held this office from 10 August 1792 to 10 April 1793, when he resigned. When the Committee of Public Safety made an appeal to the academics to assist in the defence of the republic, he applied himself wholly to these operations, and distinguished himself by his energy, writing the Description Le l'art de Fabriquer Les canons and Avis aux ouvriers en fer sur la fabrication de l'acier.

He took a very active part in the measures for the establishment of the Ecole Normale (which existed only during the first four months of the year 1795), and of the school for public works, afterwards the École Polytechnique, and was at each of them professor for descriptive geometry. Géométrie descriptive. Leçons données aux écoles normales was published in 1799 from transcriptions of his lectures given in 1795. He later published Application de l'analyse à la géométrie, which enlarged on the Lectures.

From May 1796 to October 1797 Monge was in Italy with C.L. Berthollet and some artists to select the paintings and sculptures being levied from the Italians. While there he became friendly with Napoleon. Upon his return to France, he was appointed as the Director of the École Polytechnique, but early in 1798 he was sent to Italy on a mission that ended in the establishment of the short-lived Roman Republic.

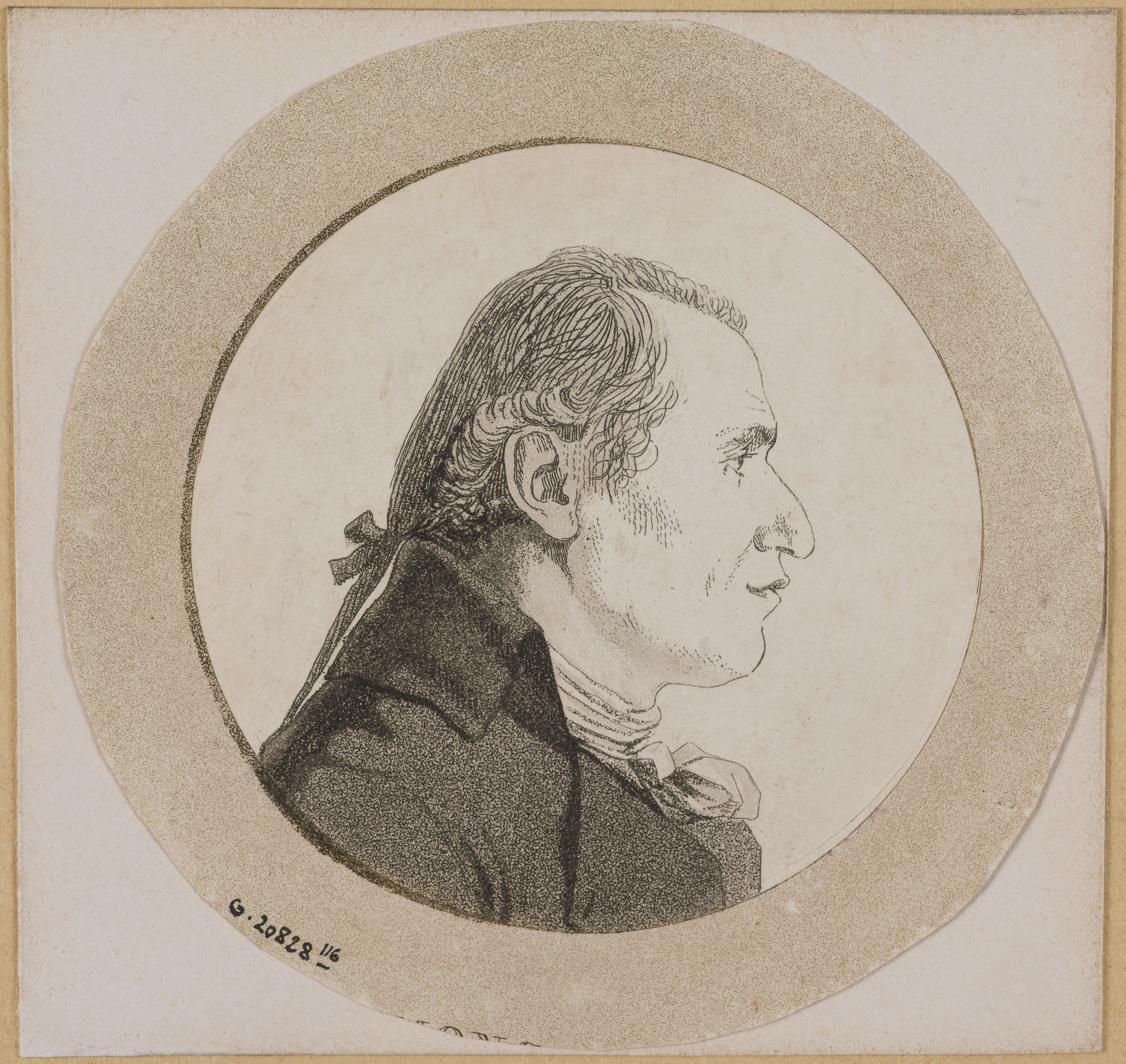
Monge during the Egyptian expedition (1798–1799). Portrait by André Dutertre

From there Monge joined Napoleon's expedition to Egypt, taking part with Berthollet in the scientific work of the Institut d'Égypte and the Egyptian Institute of Sciences and Arts. They accompanied Napoleon to Egypt, and returned with him in 1799 to France. Monge was appointed president of the Egyptian commission, and he resumed his connection with the École Polytechnique. His later mathematical papers are published (1794–1816) in the Journal and the Correspondence of the École Polytechnique. On the formation of the Sénat conservateur he was appointed a member of that body, with an ample provision and the title of count of Pelusium (Comte de Péluse), and he became the Senate conservateur's president during 1806–7. Then on the fall of Napoleon he had all of his honours taken away, and he was even excluded from the list of members of the reconstituted Institute.

Napoleon Bonaparte stated Monge was an atheist. His remains were first interred in a mausoleum in Le Père Lachaise Cemetery in Paris and later transferred to the Panthéon in Paris.

A statue portraying him was erected in Beaune in 1849. Monge's name is one of the 72 names inscribed on the base of the Eiffel Tower.

Since 4 November 1992 the Marine Nationale operate the MRIS Monge, named after him.

== Work ==
Between 1770 and 1790 Monge contributed various papers on mathematics and physics to the Memoirs of the Academy of Turin, the Mémoires des savantes étrangers of the Academy of Paris, the Mémoires of the same Academy, and the Annales de chimie, including "Sur la théorie des déblais et des remblais" ["On the theory of cut and fill"] (Mém. de l’acad. de Paris, 1781), which is an elegant investigation of the problem with earthworks referred to in the title and establishes in connection with it his capital discovery of the curves of curvature of a surface. It is also noteworthy to mention that in his Mémoire sur quelques phénomènes de la vision Monge proposed an early implicit explanation of the color constancy phenomenon based on several known observations.

Leonhard Euler, in his 1760 paper on curvature in the Berlin Memoirs, had considered, not the normals of the surface, but the normals of the plane sections through a particular normal, so that the question of the intersection of successive normals of the surface had never presented itself to him. Monge's paper gives the ordinary differential equation of the curves of curvature, and establishes the general theory in a very satisfactory manner; the application to the interesting particular case of the ellipsoid was first made by him in a later paper in 1795.

Monge's 1781 memoir is also the earliest known anticipation of linear optimization problems, in particular of the earth-mover's problem, a special case of the optimal transportation problem. Related to that, the Monge soil-transport problem leads to a weak-topology definition of a distance between distributions rediscovered many times since by such as L. V. Kantorovich, Paul Lévy, Leonid Vaseršteĭn, and others; and bearing their names in various combinations in various contexts.

Another of his papers in the volume for 1783 relates to the production of water by the combustion of hydrogen. Monge's results had been anticipated by Henry Cavendish. It was also in this time, from 1783 - 1784, that Monge worked with (Jean-François, Jean-Baptiste-Paul-Antoine, or Abbé Pierre-Romain) Clouet to liquefy sulfur dioxide by passing a stream of the gas through a U-tube sunken in a refrigerant mixture of ice and salt. This made them the first to liquefy a pure gas.

== Selected publications ==
- 1781: Mémoire sur la théorie des déblais et des remblais De l'Imprimerie Royale.
- 1793: (with Alexandre-Théophile Vandermonde and Claude-Louis Berthollet) Avis aux ouvriers en fer, sur la fabrication de l'acier. Tome 8 (Advice to ironworkers, on the manufacture of steel)
- 1794: Description de l'art de fabriquer des canons (Description of the art of making cannon)
- 1795: Application d'analyse à la géométrie
- 1799: Géométrie descriptive. Leçons données aux écoles normales (Descriptive Geometry)
- 1807: Application de l'analyse à la géométrie, à l'usage de l'Ecole impériale polytechnique.
- 1810: (with Jean Nicolas Pierre Hachette) Traité élémentaire de statique, a l'usage des écoles de la Marine, chez Courcier, Imprimeur-libraire, pour les mathematiques, quai des Augustins, 1852 translation: An elementary treatise on statics.

== See also ==
- History of the metre
- Monge array
- Monge cone
- Monge equation
- Monge patch
- Monge point
- Monge–Ampère equation
- Monge's theorem
- Clebsch representation
- Earth mover's distance
- Seconds pendulum
- Transportation theory

Political offices
Preceded by François Joseph de Gratet, vicomte Dubouchage	Minister of the Navy and the Colonies; 10 August 1792 – 10 April 1793	Succeeded by Jean Dalbarade
