= Szász–Mirakyan operator =

In functional analysis, a discipline within mathematics, the Szász–Mirakyan operators (also spelled "Mirakjan" and "Mirakian") are generalizations of Bernstein polynomials to infinite intervals, introduced by Otto Szász in 1950 and G. M. Mirakjan in 1941. They are defined by

$$\left[\mathcal{S}_n(f)\right](x) := e^{-nx}\sum_{k=0}^\infty{\frac{(nx)^k}{k!}f\left(\tfrac{k}{n}\right)}$$

where $x\in[0,\infty)\subset\mathbb{R}$ and $n\in\mathbb{N}$.

== Basic results ==
In 1964, Cheney and Sharma showed that if $f$ is convex and non-linear, the sequence $(\mathcal{S}_n(f))_{n\in\mathbb{N}}$ decreases with $n$ ($\mathcal{S}_n(f)\geq f$). They also showed that if $f$ is a polynomial of degree $\leq m$, then so is $\mathcal{S}_n(f)$ for all $n$.

A converse of the first property was shown by Horová in 1968 (Altomare & Campiti 1994:350).

== Theorem on convergence ==
In Szász's original paper, he proved the following as Theorem 3 of his paper:

If $f$ is continuous on $[0,\infty)$, having a finite limit at infinity, then $\mathcal{S}_n(f)$ converges uniformly to $f$ as $n\rightarrow\infty$.

This is analogous to a theorem stating that Bernstein polynomials approximate continuous functions on [0,1].

== Generalizations ==
A Kantorovich-type generalization is sometimes discussed in the literature. These generalizations are also called the Szász–Mirakjan–Kantorovich operators.

In 1976, C. P. May showed that the Baskakov operators can reduce to the Szász–Mirakyan operators.
