= Baskakov =

Baskakov (Russian: Баскаков) is a Russian masculine surname, its feminine counterpart is Baskakova. It may refer to

- Irina Baskakova (born 1956), Russian sprint runner
- Nikolai Baskakov (1918–1993), Russian painter, member of the Saint Petersburg Union of Artists
- Nikolay Baskakov (1905–1995), Russian Turkologist, linguist, and ethnologist
- Vasili Baskakov (born 1962), Russian football coach and a former player
- Yuri Baskakov (born 1964), Russian football referee

== See also ==
- Baskakov operator, generalizations of Bernstein polynomials, Szász–Mirakyan operators, and Lupas operators
