= Gaspard Monge's mausoleum =

Mausoleum Paris, France

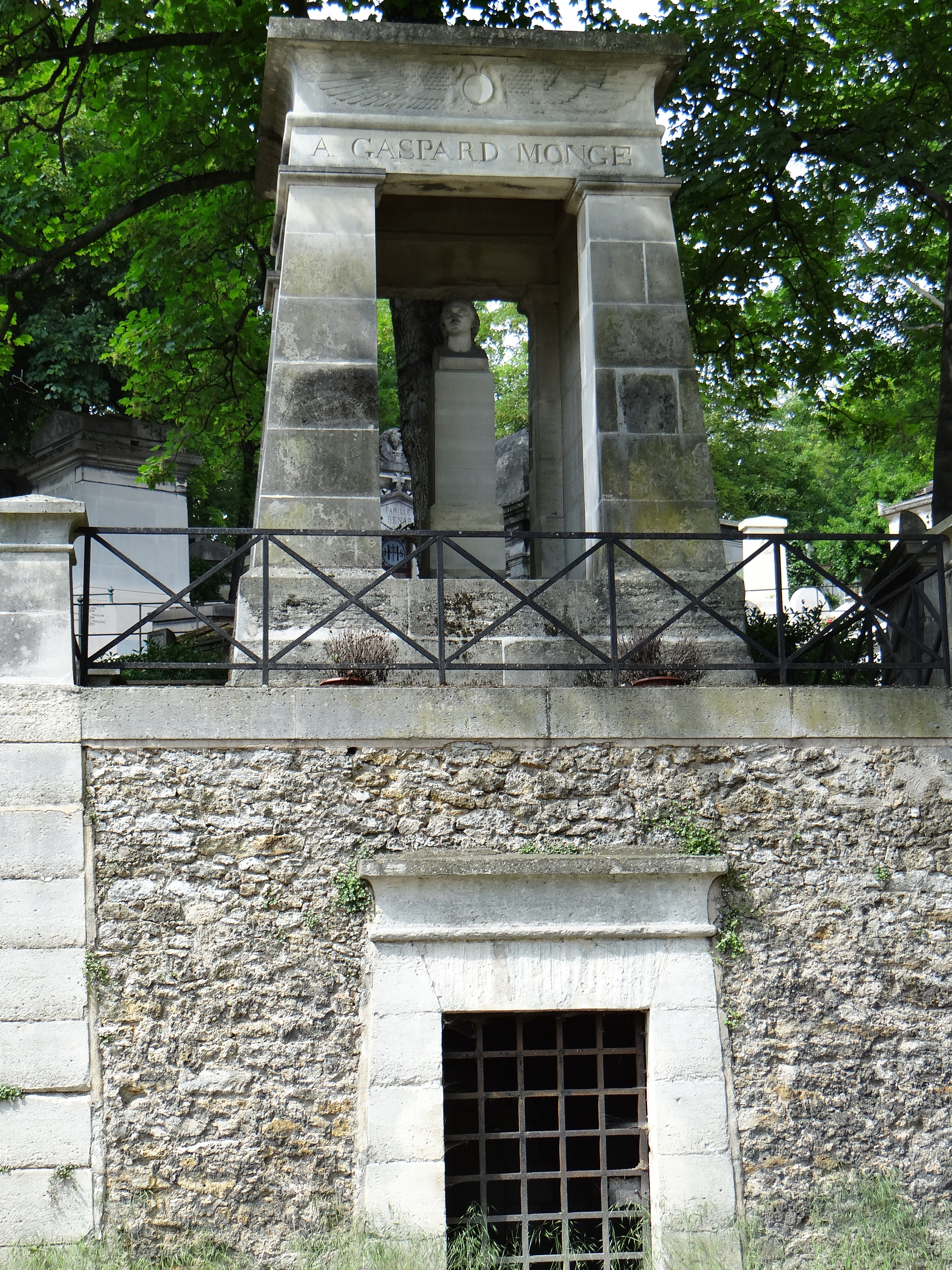
- Location: Père Lachaise Cemetery; Paris, France; 48°51′37″N 2°23′37″E

Gaspard Monge's mausoleum

Gaspard Monge, whose remains are deposited in the burying ground in Père Lachaise Cemetery, at Paris, in a magnificent mausoleum, was professor of geometry in the École polytechnique at Paris, and with Denon accompanied Napoleon Bonaparte on his memorable expedition to Egypt; one to make drawings of the architectural antiquities and sculpture, and the other the geographical delineations of that ancient country. He returned to Paris, where he assisted Denon in the publication of his antiquities. At his decease the pupils of the Polytechnique School erected this mausoleum to his memory, as a testimony of their esteem, after a design made by his friend, Monsieur Denon. The mausoleum is of Egyptian architecture, with which Denon had become familiarly acquainted.

== Description ==
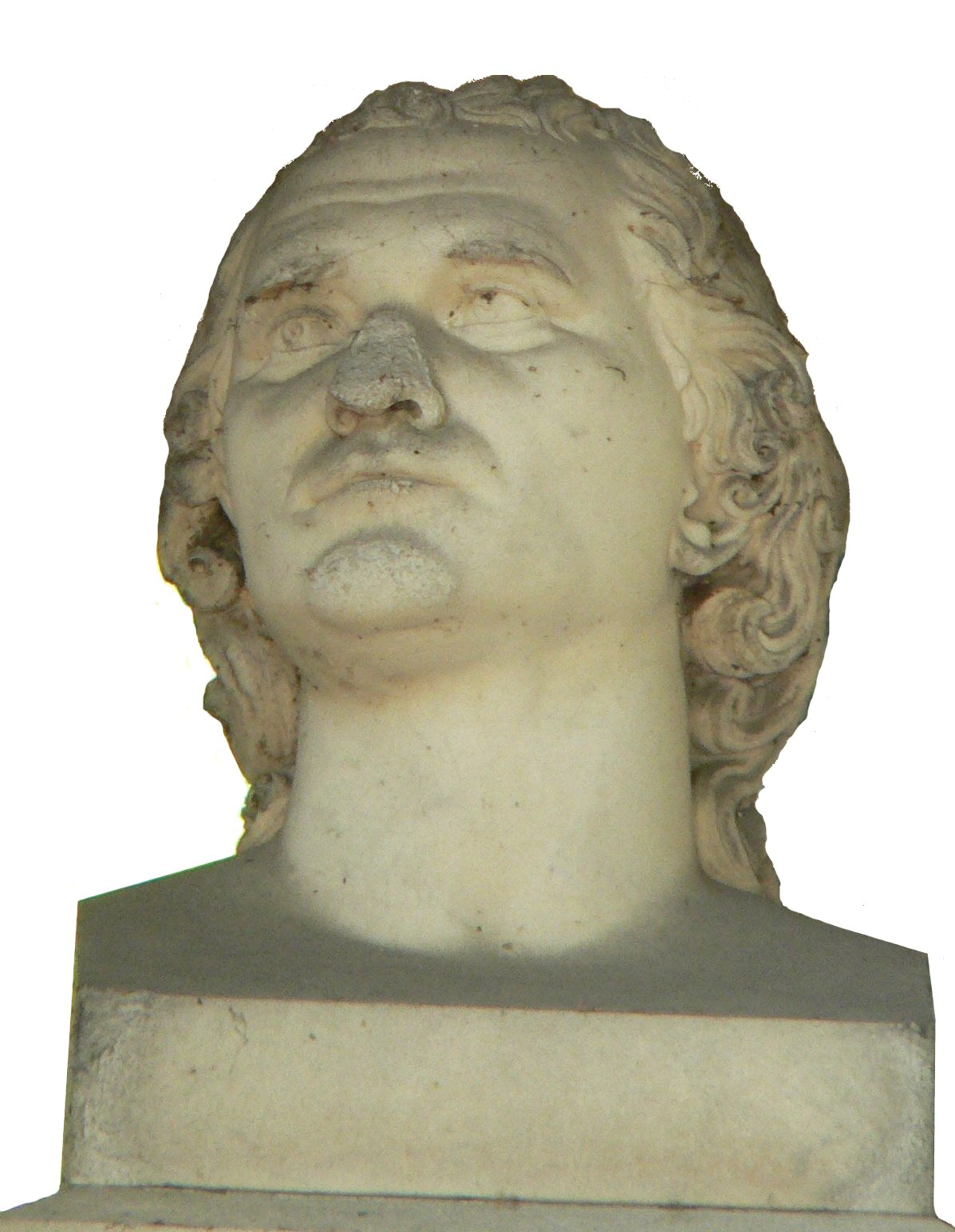
Gaspard Monge's bust.

There is a bust of Monge placed on a terminal pedestal underneath a canopy in the upper compartment, which canopy is open in front and in the back. In the cavetto cornice is an Egyptian winged globe, entwined with serpents, emblematical of time and eternity; and on the face below is engraved the following line:—

A GASPARD MONGE.

On each side of the upper compartment is inscribed the following memento mori:

LES ELEVES.
DE L'ECOLE POLYTECHNIQUE.
A G. MONGE.
COMTE DE PELUSE.

Underneath this inscription is carved in sunk work an Egyptian lotus flower in an upright position; on the back of the mausoleum is the year in which Gaspard Monge died. The body is in the cemetery below.

AN. MDCCCXX.
