= Ottó Szász =

Hungarian mathematician

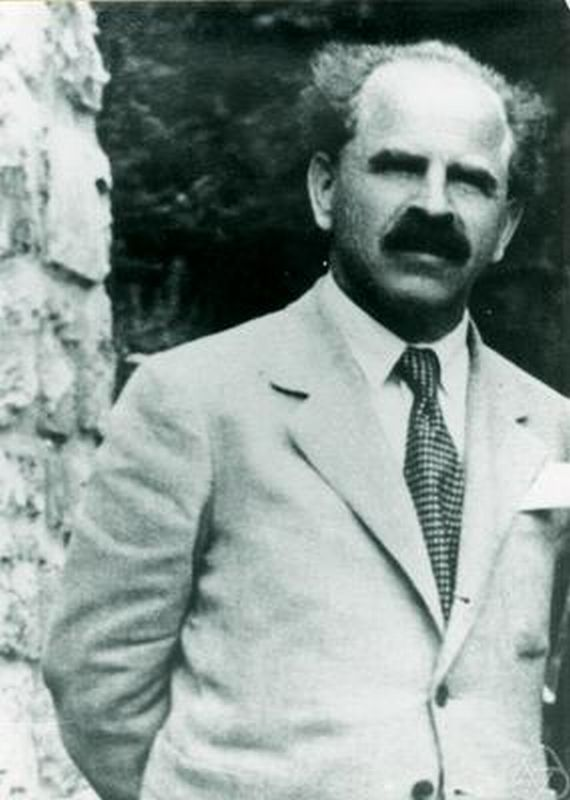

Otto Szász (11 December 1884, Hungary – 19 December 1952, Cincinnati, Ohio) was a Hungarian mathematician who worked on real analysis, in particular on Fourier series. He proved the Müntz–Szász theorem and introduced the Szász–Mirakyan operator. The Hungarian Mathematical and Physical Society awarded him the Julius Kőnig prize in 1939.

== Publications ==
- Szász, Otto (1955), Collected mathematical papers, Department of mathematics, University of Cincinnati, Cincinnati, Ohio, MR 0066285
