= Gennadii Rubinstein =

Russian mathematician

Gennadii Shlemovich Rubinstein
- Born: 26 April 1923; Odessa
- Died: 2 May 2004 (aged 81)
- Education: Odessa State University; St. Petersburg State University
- Known for: Extremal problems Function spaces Mathematical programming
- Scientific career
- Fields: Mathematics
- Workplaces: Leningrad State University; Sobolev Institute of Mathematics; Novosibirsk State University
- Doctoral advisor: Leonid V. Kantorovich

Gennadii Shlemovich Rubinstein (Russian: Геннадий Шлемович Рубинштейн) was a Russian mathematician. His research focused on mathematical programming and operations research. His name is associated to the Kantorovich–Rubinstein metric, also commonly known as the Wasserstein distance, used in optimal transport.

- Alternate form of the first name: Gennady.
- Alternate forms of the last name: Rubinšteĭn, Rubinshtein.

== Doctorate ==
Gennadii Rubinstein got his doctorate in St. Petersburg State University in 1956, under the supervision of Leonid V. Kantorovich.

== Selected publications ==
- Rubinstein, G. Sh. (1995). "On multiple-point centers of normalized measures on locally compact metric spaces". Siberian Mathematical Journal. 36 (1): 143–146. Bibcode:1995SibMJ..36..143R. doi:10.1007/BF02113928. S2CID 121093125.
- Rubinstein, G. Sh. (1970). "Duality in mathematical programming and some problems of convex analysis". Russian Mathematical Surveys. 25 (5): 171–200. Bibcode:1970RuMaS..25..171R. doi:10.1070/RM1970v025n05ABEH003800. S2CID 250903124.
- Akilov, G. P.; Kantorovich, L. V.; Rubinstein, G. Sh. (1967). "Extremal States and Extremal Controls". SIAM Journal on Control. 5 (4): 600–608. doi:10.1137/0305039.
- Rubinstein, G. Sh. (1963). "Dual extremal problems". Dokl. Akad. Nauk SSSR. 152 (2): 288–291.
- Rubinstein, G. Sh.; Urbanik, K. (1957). "Solution of an Extremal Problem". Theory of Probability & Its Applications. 2 (3): 364–366. doi:10.1137/1102025.
- Kantorovich, L. V.; Rubinstein, G. Sh. (1957). "On a functional space and certain extremum problems". Dokl. Akad. Nauk SSSR. 11 (6): 1058–1061.
- Rubinstein, G. Sh. (1954). "The general solution of a finite system of linear inequalities". Uspekhi Mat. Nauk. 9 (2(60)): 171–177.

== See also ==
- List of Russian mathematicians
