= Kantorovich theorem =

About the convergence of Newton's method

The Kantorovich theorem, or Newton–Kantorovich theorem, is a mathematical statement on the semi-local convergence of Newton's method. It was first stated by Leonid Kantorovich in 1948. It is similar to the form of the Banach fixed-point theorem, although it states existence and uniqueness of a zero rather than a fixed point.

Newton's method constructs a sequence of points that under certain conditions will converge to a solution $x$ of an equation $f(x)=0$ or a vector solution of a system of equation $F(x)=0$. The Kantorovich theorem gives conditions on the initial point of this sequence. If those conditions are satisfied then a solution exists close to the initial point and the sequence converges to that point.

== Assumptions ==
Let $X\subset\R^n$ be an open subset and $F:X \subset \R^n \to\R^n$ a differentiable function with a Jacobian $F^{\prime}(\mathbf x)$ that is locally Lipschitz continuous (for instance if $F$ is twice differentiable). That is, it is assumed that for any $x \in X$ there is an open subset $U\subset X$ such that $x \in U$ and there exists a constant $L>0$ such that for any $\mathbf x,\mathbf y\in U$

$${\|F'(\mathbf x)-F'(\mathbf y)\|} \le L\,{\|\mathbf x-\mathbf y\|}$$

holds. The norm on the left is the operator norm. In other words, for any vector $\mathbf v\in\R^n$ the inequality

$${\|F'(\mathbf x)(\mathbf v)-F'(\mathbf y)(\mathbf v)\|}\le L\,{\|\mathbf x-\mathbf y\|}\,{\|\mathbf v\|}$$

must hold.

Now choose any initial point $\mathbf x_0\in X$. Assume that $F'(\mathbf x_0)$ is invertible and construct the Newton step $\mathbf h_0=-F'(\mathbf x_0)^{-1}F(\mathbf x_0).$

The next assumption is that not only the next point $\mathbf x_1=\mathbf x_0+\mathbf h_0$ but the entire ball $B(\mathbf x_1,{\|\mathbf h_0\|})$ is contained inside the set $X$. Let $M$ be the Lipschitz constant for the Jacobian over this ball (assuming it exists).

As a last preparation, construct recursively, as long as it is possible, the sequences $(\mathbf x_k)_k$, $(\mathbf h_k)_k$, $(\alpha_k)_k$ according to

$$\begin{alignat}{2}
\mathbf h_k&={-}F'(\mathbf x_k)^{-1}F(\mathbf x_k)\\[0.4em]
\alpha_k&=M\,{\|F'(\mathbf x_k)^{-1}\|}\,{\|\mathbf h_k\|}\\[0.4em]
\mathbf x_{k+1}&=\mathbf x_k+\mathbf h_k.
\end{alignat}$$

== Statement ==
Now if $\alpha_0\le\tfrac12$ then

1. a solution $\mathbf x^*$ of $F(\mathbf x^*)=0$ exists inside the closed ball $\bar B(\mathbf x_1,{\|\mathbf h_0\|})$ and
2. the Newton iteration starting in $\mathbf x_0$ converges to $\mathbf x^*$ with at least linear order of convergence.

A statement that is more precise but slightly more difficult to prove uses the roots $t^\ast\le t^{**}$ of the quadratic polynomial

$$p(t)
=\left(\tfrac12L\,{\|F'(\mathbf x_0)^{-1}\|}^{-1}\right)t^2
-t+{\|\mathbf h_0\|}$$,
$$t^{\ast/**}=\frac{2\,{\|\mathbf h_0\|}}{1\pm\sqrt{1-2\alpha_0}}$$

and their ratio

$$\theta
=\frac{t^*}{t^{**}}
=\frac{1-\sqrt{1-2\alpha_0}}{1+\sqrt{1-2\alpha_0}}.$$

Then

1. a solution $\mathbf x^*$ exists inside the closed ball $\bar B(\mathbf x_1,\theta\,{\|\mathbf h_0\|})\subset\bar B(\mathbf x_0,t^*)$
2. it is unique inside the bigger ball $B(\mathbf x_0,t^{*\ast})$
3. and the convergence to the solution of $F$ is dominated by the convergence of the Newton iteration of the quadratic polynomial $p(t)$ towards its smallest root $t^\ast$, if $t_0=0,\,t_{k+1}=t_k-\tfrac{p(t_k)}{p'(t_k)}$, then
  $${\|\mathbf x_{k+p}-\mathbf x_k\|}\le t_{k+p}-t_k.$$
4. The quadratic convergence is obtained from the error estimate
  $${\|\mathbf x_{n+1}-\mathbf x^*\|}
\le \theta^{2^n}\,{\|\mathbf x_{n+1}-\mathbf x_n\|}
\le\frac{\theta^{2^n}}{2^n}{\|\mathbf h_0\|}.$$

== Corollary ==
In 1986, Yamamoto proved that the error evaluations of the Newton method such as Doring (1969), Ostrowski (1971, 1973), Gragg-Tapia (1974), Potra-Ptak (1980), Miel (1981), Potra (1984), can be derived from the Kantorovich theorem.

== Generalizations ==
There is a q-analog for the Kantorovich theorem. For other generalizations/variations, see Ortega & Rheinboldt (1970).

== Applications ==
Oishi and Tanabe claimed that the Kantorovich theorem can be applied to obtain reliable solutions of linear programming.
