= Hutchinson metric =

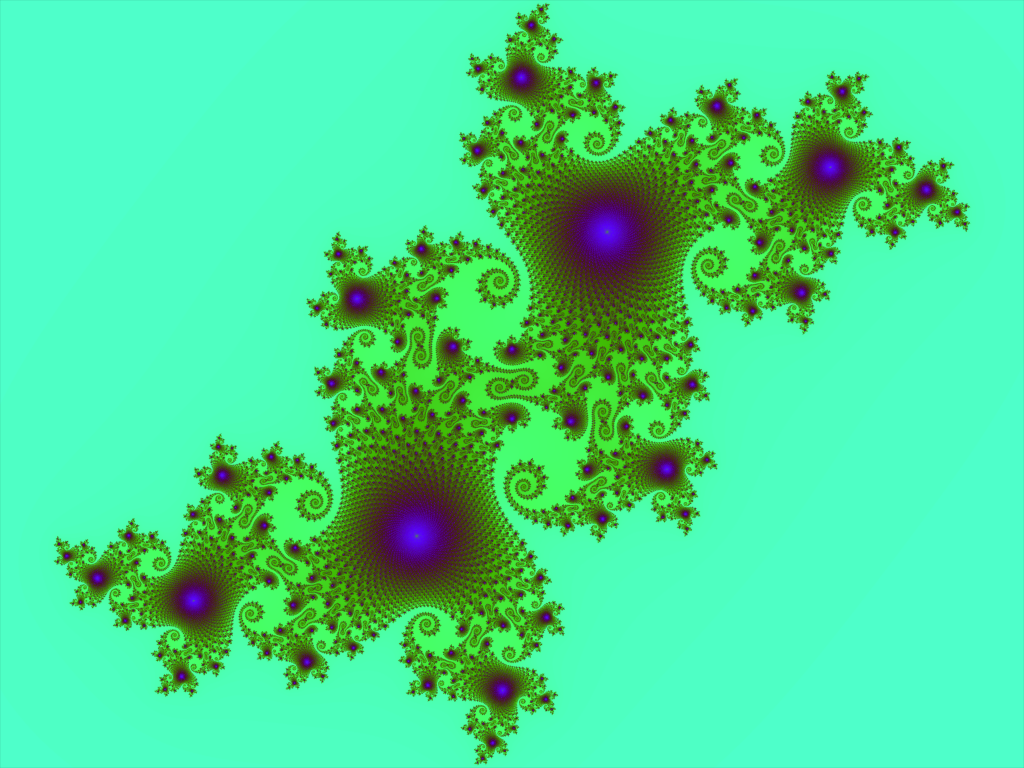
A Julia set, a fractal related to the Mandelbrot set

A fractal that models the surface of a mountain (animation)

In mathematics, the Hutchinson metric, otherwise known as the Kantorovich metric, is a function which measures "the discrepancy between two images for use in fractal image processing" and "can also be applied to describe the similarity between DNA sequences expressed as real or complex genomic signals".

== Formal definition ==
Consider only nonempty, compact, and finite metric spaces. For such a space $X$, let $P(X)$ denote the space of Borel probability measures on $X$, with

$$\delta : X \rightarrow P(X)$$

the embedding associating to $x \in X$ the point measure $\delta_x$. The support $|\mu|$ of a measure in $P(X)$ is the smallest closed subset of measure 1.

If $f : X_1 \rightarrow X_2$ is Borel measurable then the induced map

$$f_* : P(X_1) \rightarrow P(X_2)$$

associates to $\mu$ the measure $f_*(\mu)$ defined by

$$f_*(\mu)(B)= \mu(f^{-1}(B))$$

for all $B$ Borel in $X_2$.

Then the Hutchinson metric is given by

$$d(\mu_1,\mu_2) = \sup \left\lbrace \int u(x) \, \mu_1(dx) - \int u(x) \, \mu_2(dx) \right\rbrace$$

where the $\sup$ is taken over all real-valued functions $u$ with Lipschitz constant $\le\!1.$

Then $\delta$ is an isometric embedding of $X$ into $P(X)$, and if $f : X_1 \rightarrow X_2$ is Lipschitz then $f_* : P(X_1) \rightarrow P(X_2)$ is Lipschitz with the same Lipschitz constant.

== See also ==
- Wasserstein metric
- Acoustic metric
- Apophysis (software)
- Complete metric
- Fractal image compression
- Image differencing
- Metric tensor
- Multifractal system
