= Szász–Mirakjan–Kantorovich operator =

In functional analysis, a discipline within mathematics, the Szász–Mirakjan–Kantorovich operators are defined by

$$[\mathcal{T}_n(f)](x)=ne^{-nx}\sum_{k=0}^\infty{\frac{(nx)^k}{k!}\int_{k/n}^{(k+1)/n}f(t)\,dt}$$

where $x\in[0,\infty)\subset\mathbb{R}$ and $n\in\mathbb{N}$.

== See also ==
- Szász–Mirakyan operator
