= Baskakov operator =

In functional analysis, a branch of mathematics, the Baskakov operators are generalizations of Bernstein polynomials, Szász–Mirakyan operators, and Lupas operators. They are defined by

$$[\mathcal{L}_n(f)](x) = \sum_{k=0}^\infty {(-1)^k \frac{x^k}{k!} \phi_n^{(k)}(x) f\left(\frac{k}{n}\right)}$$

where $x\in[0,b)\subset\mathbb{R}$ ($b$ can be $\infty$), $n\in\mathbb{N}$, and $(\phi_n)_{n\in\mathbb{N}}$ is a sequence of functions defined on $[0,b]$ that have the following properties for all $n,k\in\mathbb{N}$:

1. $\phi_n\in\mathcal{C}^\infty[0,b]$. Alternatively, $\phi_n$ has a Taylor series on $[0,b)$.
2. $\phi_n(0) = 1$
3. $\phi_n$ is completely monotone, i.e. $(-1)^k\phi_n^{(k)}\geq 0$.
4. There is an integer $c$ such that $\phi_n^{(k+1)} = -n\phi_{n+c}^{(k)}$ whenever $n>\max\{0,-c\}$

They are named after V. A. Baskakov, who studied their convergence to bounded, continuous functions.

== Basic results ==
The Baskakov operators are linear and positive.
