= Leonid Vaserstein =

Russian-American mathematician

Leonid N. Vaserstein
- Education: Moscow State University
- Known for: Dynamical systems, Algebra
- Scientific career
- Fields: Mathematics
- Workplaces: Penn State University
- Doctoral advisor: Ilya I. Piatetski-Shapiro

Leonid Nisonovich Vaserstein (Russian: Леонид Нисонович Васерштейн) is a Russian-American mathematician, currently Professor of Mathematics at Penn State University. His research is focused on algebra and dynamical systems. He is well known for providing a simple proof of the Quillen–Suslin theorem, a result in commutative algebra, first conjectured by Jean-Pierre Serre in 1955, and then proved by Daniel Quillen and Andrei Suslin in 1976.

Leonid Vaserstein got his Master's degree and doctorate in Moscow State University, where he was until 1978. He then moved to Europe and the United States.

Alternate forms of the last name: Vaseršteĭn, Vasershtein, Wasserstein.

The Wasserstein metric was named after him by R.L. Dobrushin in 1970.

== Biography ==
Leonid Vaserstein grew up in the Soviet Union. In secondary school he won the second prize in the All-Russian High School Mathematical Olympiad. Vaserstein got his undergraduate, masters (1966), and doctoral degrees (1969) in mathematics from Moscow State University, where he worked as a lecturer concurrently with his doctoral research. After his doctoral graduation he worked for the Moscow State University-associated "Informelectro" Institute, a Federal State Unitary Enterprise focused on ways to develop industries in Russia with emphases on electrical engineering, energy efficiency, and environmental technologies like greenhouse gas mitigation. He started as a senior researcher for Informelectro and continued working there until 1978, eventually becoming head of his department. In 1978 and 1979 he made his way to the United States of America by way of Europe, taking a series of visiting professor positions at Bielefeld University, Institut des Hautes Études Scientifiques, University of Chicago, and Cornell University. In 1979, Vaserstein took a full-time position as a professor in the Department of Mathematics at Penn State University.

Vaserstein's research interests extend across the areas of topology, algebra, and number theory, and the applications of these areas, including classical groups over rings, algebraic K-theory, systems with local interactions, and optimization and planning. Additionally, Vaserstein maintains the Penn State University Math Department's website on Algebra and Number Theory.

== Selected publications ==
- Vaserstein, Leonid N. (1969). "Markov processes over denumerable products of spaces describing large systems of automata". Problemy Peredači Informacii. 5 (3): 64–72.
- Vaserstein, Leonid N. (1986). "On normal subgroups of Chevalley groups over commutative rings". Tohoku Math. J. 38 (2): 219–230. doi:10.2748/tmj/1178228489.
- Vaserstein, Leonid N. (1986). "Vector bundles and projective modules". Trans. Amer. Math. Soc. 294 (2): 749–755. doi:10.1090/s0002-9947-1986-0825734-3. MR 0825734.
- Vaserstein, L. N. (1986). "Normal subgroups of the general linear groups over von Neumann regular rings". Proc. Amer. Math. Soc. 96 (2): 209–214. doi:10.1090/s0002-9939-1986-0818445-7. MR 0818445.
- Vaserstein, L. N. (1986). "An answer to a question of M. Newman on matrix completion". Proc. Amer. Math. Soc. 97 (2): 189–196. doi:10.1090/s0002-9939-1986-0835863-1. MR 0835863.
- Vaserstein, L. N. (1988). "Reduction of a matrix depending on parameters to a diagonal form by addition operations". Proc. Amer. Math. Soc. 103 (3): 741–746. doi:10.1090/s0002-9939-1988-0947649-x. MR 0947649.
- Vaserstein, L. N. (1988). "Normal subgroups of orthogonal groups over commutative rings". Amer. J. Math. 110 (5): 955–973. doi:10.2307/2374699. JSTOR 2374699.
- Vaserstein, L. N. (1991). "Sums of cubes in polynomial rings". Math. Comp. 56 (193): 349–357. Bibcode:1991MaCom..56..349V. doi:10.1090/s0025-5718-1991-1052104-3. MR 1052104.

== See also ==
- List of Russian mathematicians
