= Helstrom =

Helstrom may refer to:

- Helstrom (TV series), an American television series, part of the Marvel Cinematic Universe
- Helstrom metric (or Bures metric), in quantum mechanics and mathematics, defining an infinitesimal distance between density matrix operators
- Echo Helstrom (band), a Portland, Oregon-based rock band

== People with the surname ==
- Carl W. Helstrom (1925–2013), American electrical engineer and quantum information theory pioneer

== See also ==
- Hellstrom (disambiguation)
