= Geometrothermodynamics =

In physics, geometrothermodynamics (GTD) is a formalism developed in 2007 by Hernando Quevedo to describe the properties of thermodynamic systems in terms of concepts of differential geometry.

Consider a thermodynamic system in the framework of classical equilibrium thermodynamics. The states of thermodynamic equilibrium are considered as points of an abstract equilibrium space in which a Riemannian metric can be introduced in several ways. In particular, one can introduce Hessian metrics like the Fisher information metric, the Weinhold metric, the Ruppeiner metric and others, whose components are calculated as the Hessian of a particular thermodynamic potential.

Another possibility is to introduce metrics which are independent of the thermodynamic potential, a property which is shared by all thermodynamic systems in classical thermodynamics. Since a change of thermodynamic potential is equivalent to a Legendre transformation, and Legendre transformations do not act in the equilibrium space, it is necessary to introduce an auxiliary space to correctly handle the Legendre transformations. This is the so-called thermodynamic phase space. If the phase space is equipped with a Legendre invariant Riemannian metric, a smooth map can be introduced that induces a thermodynamic metric in the equilibrium manifold. The thermodynamic metric can then be used with different thermodynamic potentials without changing the geometric properties of the equilibrium manifold. One expects the geometric properties of the equilibrium manifold to be related to the macroscopic physical properties.

The details of this relation can be summarized in three main points:

1. Curvature is a measure of the thermodynamical interaction.
2. Curvature singularities correspond to curvature phase transitions.
3. Thermodynamic geodesics correspond to quasi-static processes.

== Geometric aspects ==
The main ingredient of GTD is a (2n + 1)-dimensional manifold $\mathcal{T}$ with coordinates $Z^A=\{\Phi,E^a,I^a\}$, where $\Phi$ is an arbitrary thermodynamic potential, $E^a$, $a=1,2,\ldots,n$, are the extensive variables, and $I^a$ the intensive variables. It is also possible to introduce in a canonical manner the fundamental one-form $\Theta = d\Phi - \delta_{ab}I^a d E^b$ (summation over repeated indices) with $\delta_{ab}={\rm diag}(+1,\ldots,+1)$, which satisfies the condition $\Theta \wedge (d\Theta)^n \neq 0$, where $n$ is the number of thermodynamic degrees of freedom of the system, and is invariant with respect to Legendre transformations

$$\{Z^A\}\longrightarrow \{\widetilde{Z}^A\}=\{\tilde \Phi, \tilde E ^a, \tilde I ^ a\}\ ,\quad
\Phi = \tilde \Phi - \delta_{kl} \tilde E ^k \tilde I ^l ,\quad
E^i = - \tilde I ^{i}, \quad
E^j = \tilde E ^j,\quad
I^{i} = \tilde E ^i , \quad
I^j = \tilde I ^j \ ,$$

where $i\cup j$ is any disjoint decomposition of the set of indices $\{1,\ldots,n\}$, and $k,l= 1,\ldots,i$. In particular, for $i=\{1,\ldots,n\}$ and $i=\emptyset$ we obtain the total Legendre transformation and the identity, respectively. It is also assumed that in $\mathcal{T}$ there exists a metric $G$ which is also invariant with respect to Legendre transformations. The triad $(\mathcal{T},\Theta,G)$ defines a Riemannian contact manifold which is called the thermodynamic phase space (phase manifold). The space of thermodynamic equilibrium states (equilibrium manifold) is an n-dimensional Riemannian submanifold $\mathcal{E}\subset \mathcal{T}$ induced by a smooth map $\varphi:\mathcal{E}\rightarrow\mathcal{T}$, i.e. $\varphi:\{E^a\} \mapsto \{\Phi,E^a,I^a\}$, with $\Phi=\Phi(E^a)$ and $I^a= I^a(E^a)$, such that $\varphi^*(\Theta)=\varphi^*(d\Phi - \delta_{ab}I^{a}dE^{b})=0$ holds, where $\varphi^*$ is the pullback of $\varphi$. The manifold $\mathcal{E}$ is naturally equipped with the Riemannian metric $g=\varphi^*(G)$. The purpose of GTD is to demonstrate that the geometric properties of $\mathcal{E}$ are related to the thermodynamic properties of a system with fundamental thermodynamic equation $\Phi=\Phi(E^a)$. The condition of invariance with respect total Legendre transformations leads to the metrics

$$G^I = (d\Phi- \delta_{ab}I^a d E^b)^2 + \Lambda\, (\xi_{ab} E^a I^b)\left( \delta_{cd} dE^c d I^d\right)\ ,\quad
\delta_{ab}={\rm diag}(1,\ldots,1)$$

$$G^{II} = (d\Phi- \delta_{ab}I^a d E^b)^2 + \Lambda\, (\xi_{ab} E^a I^b)\left( \eta_{cd} dE^c d I^d\right)\ ,\quad
\eta_{ab}={\rm diag}(-1,1,\ldots,1)$$

where $\xi_{ab}$ is a constant diagonal matrix that can be expressed in terms of $\delta_{ab}$ and $\eta_{ab}$, and $\Lambda$ is an arbitrary Legendre invariant function of $Z^A$. The metrics $G^I$ and $G^{II}$ have been used to describe thermodynamic systems with first and second order phase transitions, respectively. The most general metric which is invariant with respect to partial Legendre transformations is

$$G^{III} = (d\Phi- \delta_{ab}I^a d E^b)^2 + \Lambda\, ( E_a I_a)^{2k+1} \left( dE^a d I^a\right)\ ,
\quad
E_a= \delta_{ab} E^b \ ,
\quad I_a = \delta_{ab} I^b \ .$$

The components of the corresponding metric for the equilibrium manifold ${\mathcal E}$ can be computed as

$$g_{ab} = \frac{\partial Z^A}{\partial E^a}\frac{\partial Z^B}{\partial E^b} G_{AB}\ .$$

== Applications ==
GTD has been applied to describe laboratory systems like the ideal gas, van der Waals gas, the Ising model, etc., more exotic systems like black holes in different gravity theories, in the context of relativistic cosmology, and to describe chemical reactions .
