= Inner angle =

Inner angle may refer to:

- internal angle of a polygon
- Fubini–Study metric on a Hilbert space
