= Hellstrom =

Hellstrom or Hellström may refer to:

== People with the name ==
- Hellström (surname)

== In media ==
- Daimon Hellstrom, a Marvel Comics character
- Satana Hellstrom, a Marvel Comics character
- Hellstrom's Hive, a 1973 science fiction novel written by Frank Herbert
- The Hellstrom Chronicle, a 1971 film
- J. T. Hellstrom, fictional character on the CBS soap opera The Young and the Restless

== See also ==
- Helstrom (disambiguation)
