= Equilibrium thermodynamics =

Field of scientific study

Equilibrium thermodynamics is the systematic study of transformations of matter and energy in systems in terms of a concept called thermodynamic equilibrium. The word equilibrium implies a state of balance. Equilibrium thermodynamics, in origins, derives from analysis of the Carnot cycle. Here, typically a system, as cylinder of gas, initially in its own state of internal thermodynamic equilibrium, is set out of balance via heat input from a combustion reaction. Then, through a series of steps, as the system settles into its final equilibrium state, work is extracted.

In an equilibrium state the potentials, or driving forces, within the system, are in exact balance. A central aim in equilibrium thermodynamics is: given a system in a well-defined initial state of thermodynamic equilibrium, subject to accurately specified constraints, to calculate, when the constraints are changed by an externally imposed intervention, what the state of the system will be once it has reached a new equilibrium. An equilibrium state is mathematically ascertained by seeking the extrema of a thermodynamic potential function, whose nature depends on the constraints imposed on the system. For example, a chemical reaction at constant temperature and pressure will reach equilibrium at a minimum of its components' Gibbs free energy and a maximum of their entropy.

Equilibrium thermodynamics differs from non-equilibrium thermodynamics, in that, with the latter, the state of the system under investigation will typically not be uniform but will vary locally in those as energy, entropy, and temperature distributions as gradients are imposed by dissipative thermodynamic fluxes. In equilibrium thermodynamics, by contrast, the state of the system will be considered uniform throughout, defined macroscopically by such quantities as temperature, pressure, or volume. Systems are studied in terms of change from one equilibrium state to another; such a change is called a thermodynamic process.

Ruppeiner geometry is a type of information geometry used to study thermodynamics. It claims that thermodynamic systems can be represented by Riemannian geometry, and that statistical properties can be derived from the model. This geometrical model is based on the idea that there exist equilibrium states which can be represented by points on two-dimensional surface and the distance between these equilibrium states is related to the fluctuation between them.

== See also ==
- Non-equilibrium thermodynamics
- Thermodynamics
