= Carl W. Helstrom =

- Born: February 22, 1925; Easton, Pennsylvania
- Died: October 15, 2013 (aged 88); La Jolla, California
- Education: Lehigh University; California Institute of Technology
- Known for: Quantum state discrimination Helstrom metric
- Scientific career
- Fields: Electrical Engineering
- Workplaces: University of California, San Diego

Carl W. Helstrom (1925–2013) was one of the earliest pioneers in the field of quantum information theory and in theoretical quantum metrology. He is well known in this field for deriving the quantum Cramér-Rao bound, for discovering what is now known as the Helstrom measurement, the quantum measurement with minimum error probability to discriminate one quantum state from another.

== Personal life ==
He was born in Easton, Pennsylvania, on February 22, 1925. In 1956, he married Barbro Dahlbom.

== Education ==
He received the B.S degree in engineering physics from Lehigh University, in Bethlehem, Pennsylvania, in 1947 and the Ph.D. degree in physics from the California Institute of Technology, Pasadena, in 1951.

== Career ==
From 1944 to 1946 he was a radio technician in the U.S. Navy. From 1951 to 1966 he worked in applied mathematics at the Westinghouse Research Laboratories, Pittsburgh, Pennsylvania. On leave during the 1963–1964 academic year, he lectured in the Department of Engineering, University of California, Los Angeles. He joined the University of California, San Diego in 1966, where he was professor, then professor emeritus of electrical engineering. From 1971 to 1973 and 1974 to 1977 he was chairman of his Electrical Engineering and Computer Sciences department, and during the 1973–1974 and 1986–1987 academic years he was Professeur Associé at the Université de Paris-Sud. From 1965 to 1967, Helstrom served as associate editor for Detection Theory on the editorial board of the IEEE Transactions on Information Theory; 1967 to 1971 he served as editor-in-chief of the same journal. He was a member of Phi Beta Kappa.

== Honors ==
For his contributions to communication and detection theory, Helstrom was elected Fellow of the IEEE in 1970. He was also a Fellow of the Optical Society of America.

== Books ==
He has written a textbook which has been widely read by experts in quantum information theory and in theoretical quantum metrology . He authored several other textbooks on signal detection and estimation theory.

== See also ==
- Quantum measurement
- POVM
