= Hellström (surname) =

Hellström is a Swedish surname.

== Geographical distribution ==
As of 2014, 89.1% of all known bearers of the surname Hellström were residents of Sweden (frequency 1:1,149) and 8.9% of Finland (1:6,444).

In Sweden, the frequency of the surname was higher than national average (1:1,149) in the following counties:

1. Västernorrland County (1:499)
2. Västmanland County (1:667)
3. Jämtland County (1:675)
4. Dalarna County (1:733)
5. Södermanland County (1:757)
6. Gävleborg County (1:767)
7. Gotland County (1:835)
8. Örebro County (1:932)
9. Uppsala County (1:943)
10. Östergötland County (1:1,086)
11. Stockholm County (1:1,092)

In Finland, the frequency of the surname was higher than national average (1:6,444) in the following regions:

1. Åland (1:659)
2. Southwest Finland (1:1,987)
3. Ostrobothnia (1:2,556)
4. Uusimaa (1:4,124)

== People ==
- Håkan Hellström (born 1974), Swedish musician
- Jan Hellström (born 1960), Swedish footballer
- Jens Hellström (born 1977), Swedish racing driver
- Jesper Hellström (born 1995), Swedish triple jumper
- Johan Hellström (1907–1989), Finnish boxer
- Jonathan Hellström (born 1988), Swedish footballer who plays for Gefle IF
- Kristian Hellström (1880–1946), Swedish athlete
- Lilly Hellström (1866–1930), Swedish schoolteacher and newspaper editor
- Mats Hellström (1942–2026), Swedish politician
- Paul Hellstrom Foster (1939–1967), United States Marine
- Ronnie Hellström (1949–2022), Swedish football player
- Sara Hjellström (born 1993), Swedish singer known as Shy Martin
- Sheila A. Hellstrom (1935–2020), Canadian general
- Thure Hellström (1857–1930), Finnish architect
