= Roland Dobrushin =

Russian mathematician (1929–1995)

Roland L. Dobrushin
- Рола́нд Л. Добру́шин
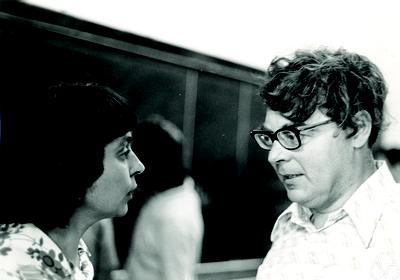
- Roland Dobrushin and Elena Sinai-Vul
- Born: July 20, 1929; St Petersburg
- Died: November 12, 1995 (aged 66); Moscow
- Education: Moscow State University
- Scientific career
- Fields: Mathematics
- Doctoral advisor: Andrey Kolmogorov
- Doctoral students: Michel Deza

Roland Lvovich Dobrushin (Russian: Рола́нд Льво́вич Добру́шин) (July 20, 1929 – November 12, 1995) was a mathematician who made important contributions to probability theory, mathematical physics, and information theory.

== Life and work ==
Dobrushin received his Ph.D. at Moscow State University under the supervision of Andrey Kolmogorov.

In statistical mechanics, he introduced (simultaneously with Lanford and Ruelle) the DLR equations for the Gibbs measure. Together with Kotecký and Shlosman, he studied the formation of droplets in Ising-type models, providing mathematical justification of the Wulff construction.

He was a foreign member of the American Academy of Arts and Sciences, Academia Europæa and US National Academy of Sciences.

The Dobrushin prize was established in his honour.

with Harry Kesten and Rudolf Peierls in Oxford, 1993
