= Echo Helstrom (band) =

Former American musical group

Echo Helstron
- Origin: United States
- Genres: Progressive rock Fusion
- Years active: Unknown-present
- Label: Unsigned
- Members: Ross Seligman, guitar and vocals Dan Gildea, guitar Damian Erskine, bass Randy Rollofson, drums
- Past members: Alessandra Dinu, violin Mike McDaniel, drums Chris Mosley, guitar Will Amend, bass and vocals

Echo Helstrom was a Portland, Oregon-based rock band led by former Blanket Music guitarist Ross Seligman. Its members met in the music department at Portland State University.

The members are all trained in classical and jazz music, and Echo Helstrom has been called an "orchestral rock band" due to their instrumentation (violin, and bowed standup bass instead of electric bass guitar) and arrangements, which runs from chamber music to punk rock and many genres in between. The result has been described as "...a combination of raw emotional power with sophisticated melodic beauty" (and more prosaically as "Kurt Cobain meets Leonard Bernstein").

The band is named after an early girlfriend of Bob Dylan, and Seligman’s lyrics and vocals have been described as Dylanesque.

The song "Floor 104" on their eponymous first album, with its haunting ending of "please don’t go / please don’t go / to work today / to work today", is dedicated to Seligman’s stepbrother Laurence Polatsch, who perished in the World Trade Center on September 11, 2001.

Ross Seligman was the Music Supervisor, Bandleader, and guitarist of the national tour of "One Night With Janis Joplin". The song "Where I Sleep" from the album "The Veil" was featured in the Feb. 12th, 2008 episode entitled 'In Da Club' of "One Tree Hill" on the station WB.

== Discography ==
- Echo Helstrom (released 2003) (self-release)
- The Veil (released November 2007) (self-release)
- Paper Airplane (EP) (released January 2010)
