= Bures metric =

Riemannian metric on the space of mixed states of a quantum system

In mathematics, in the area of quantum information geometry, the Bures metric (named after Donald Bures) or Helstrom metric (named after Carl W. Helstrom) defines an infinitesimal distance between density matrix operators defining quantum states. It is a quantum generalization of the Fisher information metric, and is identical to the Fubini–Study metric when restricted to the pure states alone.

== Definition ==
The Bures metric may be defined as

$$[D_\text{B}(\rho, \rho+d\rho)]^2 = \frac{1}{2}\mbox{tr}( d \rho G ),$$

where $G$ is the Hermitian 1-form operator implicitly given by

$$\rho G + G \rho = d \rho,$$

which is a special case of a continuous Lyapunov equation.

Some of the applications of the Bures metric include that given a target error, it allows the calculation of the minimum number of measurements to distinguish two different states and the use of the volume element as a candidate for the Jeffreys prior probability density for mixed quantum states.

== Bures distance ==
The Bures distance is the finite version of the infinitesimal square distance described above and is given by

$$D_\text{B}(\rho_1,\rho_2)^2 = 2 \left[1 - \sqrt{F(\rho_1, \rho_2)}\right],$$

where $F$ is the fidelity, and it is defined as

$$F(\rho_1,\rho_2) = \Big[\mbox{tr}\Big( \sqrt{ \sqrt{\rho_1}\rho_2\sqrt{\rho_1}}\Big)\Big]^2.$$

Another associated function is the Bures arc also known as Bures angle, Bures length or quantum angle, defined as

$$D_\text{A}(\rho_1,\rho_2) = \arccos \sqrt{F(\rho_1,\rho_2)},$$

which is a measure of the statistical distance between quantum states.

== Wootters distance ==
When both density operators are diagonal (so that they are just classical probability distributions), then let $\rho_1 = \mathrm{diag}(p_1, \dots)$ and similarly $\rho_2 = \mathrm{diag}(q_1, \dots)$, then the fidelity is
$$\sqrt{F} = \sum_i \sqrt{p_i q_i}$$
with the Bures length becoming the Wootters distance $\textstyle \arccos \left(\sum_i \sqrt{p_i q_i}\right)$. The Wootters distance is the geodesic distance between the probability distributions $p, q$ under the chi-squared metric $\textstyle ds^2 = \frac 12 \sum_i \frac{dp_i^2}{p_i}$.

Perform a change of variables with $x_i := \sqrt{p_i}$, then the chi-squared metric becomes $\textstyle ds^2 = \sum_i dx_i^2$. Since $\textstyle \sum_i x_i^2 = \sum_i p_i = 1$, the points $x$ are restricted to move on the positive quadrant of a unit hypersphere. So, the geodesics are just the great circles on the hypersphere, and we also obtain the Wootters distance formula.

If both density operators are pure states, $\psi$, $\phi$, then the fidelity is $\sqrt{F} = \vert\langle \psi \vert \phi \rangle \vert$, and we obtain the quantum version of Wootters distance $\arccos (\vert\langle \psi \vert \phi \rangle \vert)$.

In particular, the direct Bures distance between any two orthogonal states is $\sqrt 2$, while the Bures distance summed along the geodesic path connecting them is $\pi/2$.

== Quantum Fisher information ==
The Bures metric can be seen as the quantum equivalent of the Fisher information metric and can be rewritten in terms of the variation of coordinate parameters as

$$[D_\text{B}(\rho, \rho+d\rho)]^2 = \frac{1}{2}
\mbox{tr}\left( \frac{d \rho}{d \theta^{\mu}} L_{\nu} \right) d \theta^{\mu} d\theta^{\nu},$$

which holds as long as $\rho$ and $\rho+d\rho$ have the same rank. In cases where they do not have the same rank, there is an additional term on the right hand side. $L_\mu$ is the symmetric logarithmic derivative operator (SLD) defined from

$$\frac{\rho L_{\mu} + L_{\mu} \rho}{2} = \frac{d \rho^{\,}}{d \theta^{\mu}}.$$

In this way, one has

$$[D_\text{B}(\rho, \rho+d\rho)]^2 =
\frac{1}{2} \mbox{tr}\left[ \rho \frac{L_{\mu} L_{\nu} + L_{\nu} L_{\mu}}{2}  \right] d \theta^{\mu} d\theta^{\nu},$$

where the quantum Fisher metric (tensor components) is identified as

$$J_{\mu \nu} = \mbox{tr}\left[ \rho \frac{L_{\mu} L_{\nu} + L_{\nu} L_{\mu}}{2}\right].$$

The definition of the SLD implies that the quantum Fisher metric is 4 times the Bures metric. In other words, given that $g_{\mu\nu}$ are components of the Bures metric tensor, one has

$$J_{\mu\nu}^{ } = 4 g_{\mu \nu}.$$

As it happens with the classical Fisher information metric, the quantum Fisher metric can be used to find the Cramér–Rao bound of the covariance.

== Explicit formulas ==
The actual computation of the Bures metric is not evident from the definition, so, some formulas were developed for that purpose. For 2 × 2 and 3 × 3 systems, respectively, the quadratic form of the Bures metric is calculated as

$$[D_\text{B}(\rho, \rho+d\rho)]^2 =
\frac{1}{4}\mbox{tr}\left[ d \rho d \rho + \frac{1}{\det(\rho)}(\mathbf{1}-\rho)d\rho (\mathbf{1}-\rho)d\rho \right],$$
$$[D_\text{B}(\rho, \rho+d\rho)]^2 =
\frac{1}{4}\mbox{tr}\left[ d \rho d \rho + \frac{3}{1-\mbox{tr} \rho^3} (\mathbf{1}-\rho)d\rho (\mathbf{1}-\rho)d\rho
+  \frac{3 \det{\rho} }{1-\mbox{tr} \rho^3} (\mathbf{1}-\rho^{-1})d\rho (\mathbf{1}-\rho^{-1})d\rho
\right].$$

For general systems, the Bures metric can be written in terms of the eigenvectors and eigenvalues of the density matrix $\textstyle \rho=\sum_{j=1}^n\lambda_j|j\rangle\langle j|$ as

$$[D_\text{B}(\rho, \rho+d\rho)]^2 = \frac{1}{2} \sum_{j,k=1}^{n} \frac{|\langle j| d\rho | k\rangle  |^2}{\lambda_j+\lambda_k},$$

as an integral,

$$[D_\text{B}(\rho, \rho+d\rho)]^2 = \frac{1}{2}\int_0^\infty\text{tr}[e^{-\rho t}d\rho e^{-\rho t}d\rho]\ dt,$$

or in terms of Kronecker product and vectorization,

$$[D_\text{B}(\rho, \rho+d\rho)]^2 = \frac{1}{2}\text{vec}[d\rho]^\dagger\big(\rho^*\otimes \mathbf{1}+\mathbf{1}\otimes\rho\big)^{-1}\text{vec}[d\rho],$$

where $^*$ denotes complex conjugate, and $^\dagger$ denotes conjugate transpose. This formula holds for invertible density matrices. For non-invertible density matrices, the inverse above is substituted by the Moore–Penrose inverse. Alternatively, the expression can be also computed by performing a limit on a certain mixed and thus invertible state.

== Two-level system ==
The state of a two-level system can be parametrized with three variables as

$$\rho = \frac{1}{2}( I + \boldsymbol{r\cdot\sigma} ),$$

where $\boldsymbol{\sigma}$ is the vector of Pauli matrices and $\boldsymbol{r}$ is the (three-dimensional) Bloch vector satisfying $r^2 ~\stackrel{\mathrm{def} }{=}~ \boldsymbol{r\cdot r} \le 1$. The components of the Bures metric in this parametrization can be calculated as

$$\mathsf{g} = \frac{\mathsf{I}}{4}+\frac{\boldsymbol{r\otimes r}}{4(1-r^2)} .$$

The Bures measure can be calculated by taking the square root of the determinant to find

$$dV_\text{B} = \frac{d^3\boldsymbol{r}}{8\sqrt{ 1 - r^2}},$$

which can be used to calculate the Bures volume as

$$V_\text{B} = \iiint_{r^2\leq 1}\frac{d^3\boldsymbol{r}}{8\sqrt{1-r^2}}
= \frac{\pi^2}{8} .$$

== Three-level system ==
The state of a three-level system can be parametrized with eight variables as

$$\rho = \frac{1}{3}(  I + \sqrt{3} \sum_{\nu=1}^8\xi_\nu\lambda_\nu),$$

where $\lambda_\nu$ are the eight Gell-Mann matrices and $\boldsymbol \xi \in\mathbb{R}^8$ the 8-dimensional Bloch vector satisfying certain constraints.

== See also ==
- Fubini–Study metric
- Fidelity of quantum states
- Fisher information
- Fisher information metric
