= Fubini–Study metric =

Metric on a complex projective space endowed with Hermitian form

In mathematics, the Fubini–Study metric (IPA: /fubini-ʃtuːdi/) is a Kähler metric on a complex projective space CP^{n} endowed with a Hermitian form. This metric was originally described in 1904 and 1905 by Guido Fubini and Eduard Study.

A Hermitian form in (the vector space) C^{n+1} defines a unitary subgroup U(n + 1) in GL(n + 1,C). A Fubini–Study metric is determined up to homothety (overall scaling) by invariance under such a U(n + 1) action; thus it is homogeneous. Equipped with a Fubini–Study metric, CP^{n} is a symmetric space. The particular normalization on the metric depends on the application. In Riemannian geometry, one uses a normalization so that the Fubini–Study metric simply relates to the standard metric on the (2n + 1)-sphere. In algebraic geometry, one uses a normalization making CP^{n} a Hodge manifold.

== Construction ==
The Fubini–Study metric arises naturally in the quotient space construction of complex projective space.

Specifically, one may define CP^{n} to be the space consisting of all complex lines in C^{n+1}, i.e., the quotient of C^{n+1} \ {0} by the equivalence relation relating all complex multiples of each point together. This agrees with the quotient by the diagonal group action of the multiplicative group C^{*} = C \ {0}:

$$\mathbf{CP}^n = \left\{ \mathbf{Z} = [Z_0,Z_1,\ldots,Z_n] \in {\mathbf C}^{n+1}\smallsetminus\{0\} \right\} \big/ \{ \mathbf{Z} \sim c\mathbf{Z}, c \in \mathbf{C}^* \}.$$

A point of CP^{n} is thus identified with an equivalence class of (n + 1)-tuples [Z_{0},...,Z_{n}] modulo nonzero complex rescaling; the Z_{i} are called homogeneous coordinates of the point.

Furthermore, one may realize this quotient mapping in two steps: since multiplication by a nonzero complex scalar z = R e^{iθ} can be uniquely thought of as the composition of a dilation by the modulus R followed by a counterclockwise rotation about the origin by an angle $\theta$, the quotient mapping C^{n+1} \ {0} → CP^{n} splits into two pieces,

$$\mathbf{C}^{n+1}\smallsetminus\{0\} \mathrel{\stackrel{(a)}\longrightarrow} S^{2n+1} \mathrel{\stackrel{(b)}\longrightarrow} \mathbf{CP}^n$$

where step (a) is a quotient by the dilation Z ~ RZ for R ∈ R^{+}, the multiplicative group of positive real numbers, and step (b) is a quotient by the rotations Z ~ e^{iθ}Z.

The result of the quotient in (a) is the real hypersphere S^{2n+1} defined by the equation |Z|^{2} = |Z_{0}|^{2} + ... + |Z_{n}|^{2} = 1. The quotient in (b) realizes CP^{n} = S^{2n+1}/S^{1}, where S^{1} represents the group of rotations. This quotient is realized explicitly by the famous Hopf fibration S^{1} → S^{2n+1} → CP^{n}, the fibers of which are among the great circles of $S^{2n+1}$.

=== As a metric quotient ===
When a quotient is taken of a Riemannian manifold (or metric space in general), care must be taken to ensure that the quotient space is endowed with a metric that is well-defined. For instance, if a group G acts on a Riemannian manifold (X,g), then in order for the orbit space X/G to possess an induced metric, $g$ must be constant along G-orbits in the sense that for any element h ∈ G and pair of vector fields $X,Y$ we must have g(Xh,Yh) = g(X,Y).

The standard Hermitian metric on C^{n+1} is given in the standard basis by

$$ds^2 = d\mathbf{Z} \otimes d\bar{\mathbf{Z}} = dZ_0 \otimes d\bar{Z}_0 + \cdots + dZ_n \otimes d\bar{Z}_n$$

whose realification is the standard Euclidean metric on R^{2n+2}. This metric is not invariant under the diagonal action of C^{*}, so we are unable to directly push it down to CP^{n} in the quotient. However, this metric is invariant under the diagonal action of S^{1} = U(1), the group of rotations. Therefore, step (b) in the above construction is possible once step (a) is accomplished.

The Fubini–Study metric is the metric induced on the quotient CP^{n} = S^{2n+1}/S^{1}, where $S^{2n+1}$ carries the so-called "round metric" endowed upon it by restriction of the standard Euclidean metric to the unit hypersphere.

=== In local affine coordinates ===
Corresponding to a point in CP^{n} with homogeneous coordinates $[Z_0:\dots:Z_n]$, there is a unique set of n coordinates $(z_1,\dots,z_n)$ such that

$$[Z_0:\dots:Z_n] \sim [1,z_1,\dots,z_n],$$

provided $Z_0\neq 0$; specifically, $z_j=Z_j/Z_0$. The $(z_1,\dots,z_n)$ form an affine coordinate system for CP^{n} in the coordinate patch $U_0=\{Z_0\neq 0\}$. One can develop an affine coordinate system in any of the coordinate patches $U_i=\{Z_i\neq 0\}$ by dividing instead by $Z_i$ in the obvious manner. The n + 1 coordinate patches $U_i$ cover CP^{n}, and it is possible to give the metric explicitly in terms of the affine coordinates $(z_1,\dots,z_n)$ on $U_i$. The coordinate derivatives define a frame $\{\partial_1,\ldots,\partial_n\}$ of the holomorphic tangent bundle of CP^{n}, in terms of which the Fubini–Study metric has Hermitian components

$$g_{i\bar{j}} = h(\partial_i,\bar{\partial}_j) = \frac{\left(1+|\mathbf{z}|\vphantom{l}^2\right)\delta_{i\bar{j}} - \bar{z}_i z_j}{\left(1+|\mathbf{z}|\vphantom{l}^2\right)^2}.$$

where |z|^{2} = |z_{1}|^{2} + ... + |z_{n}|^{2}. That is, the Hermitian matrix of the Fubini–Study metric in this frame is

$$\bigl[g_{i\bar{j}}\bigr] = \frac{1}{\left(1+|\mathbf{z}|\vphantom{l}^2\right)^2}
\left[
\begin{array}{cccc}
1+|\mathbf{z}|^2 - |z_1|^2 & -\bar{z}_1 z_2 & \cdots & -\bar{z}_1 z_n \\
-\bar{z}_2 z_1 & 1 + |\mathbf{z}|^2 - |z_2|^2 & \cdots & -\bar{z}_2 z_n \\
\vdots & \vdots & \ddots & \vdots \\
-\bar{z}_n z_1 & -\bar{z}_n z_2 & \cdots & 1 + |\mathbf{z}|^2 - |z_n|^2
\end{array}
\right]$$

Note that each matrix element is unitary-invariant: the diagonal action $\mathbf{z} \mapsto e^{i\theta}\mathbf{z}$ will leave this matrix unchanged.

Accordingly, the line element is given by

$$\begin{align}
ds^2 &= g_{i\bar{j}} \, dz^i \, d\bar{z}^j \\[4pt]
&= \frac{\left(1+|\mathbf{z}|\vphantom{l}^2\right)|d\mathbf{z}|^2 - (\bar{\mathbf{z}}\cdot d\mathbf{z})(\mathbf{z}\cdot d\bar{\mathbf{z}})}{\left(1+|\mathbf{z}|\vphantom{l}^2\right)^2} \\[4pt]
&= \frac{(1+z_i\bar{z}^i)\,dz_j\,d\bar{z}^j - \bar{z}^j z_i\,dz_j\,d\bar{z}^i}{\left(1+z_i\bar{z}^i\right)^2}.
\end{align}$$

In this last expression, the summation convention is used to sum over Latin indices i,j that range from 1 to n.

The metric can be derived from the following Kähler potential:

$$K = \ln(1 + z_i \bar{z}^i) = \ln(1 + \delta_{i\bar{j}} z^i \bar{z}^j)$$

as

$$g_{i\bar{j}}=K_{i\bar{j}}=\frac{\partial^2}{\partial z^i \, \partial\bar{z}^j} K$$

=== Using homogeneous coordinates ===
An expression is also possible in the notation of homogeneous coordinates, commonly used to describe projective varieties of algebraic geometry: Z = [Z_{0}:...:Z_{n}]. Formally, subject to suitably interpreting the expressions involved, one has

$$\begin{align}
ds^2 &= \frac{|\mathbf{Z}|^2|d\mathbf{Z}|^2 - (\bar{\mathbf{Z}}\cdot d\mathbf{Z})(\mathbf{Z}\cdot d\bar{\mathbf{Z}})}{|\mathbf{Z}|^4}\\
&=\frac{Z_\alpha\bar{Z}^\alpha dZ_\beta d\bar{Z}^\beta - \bar{Z}^\alpha Z_\beta dZ_\alpha d\bar{Z}^\beta}{\left(Z_\alpha\bar{Z}^\alpha\right)^2}\\
&= \frac {2Z_{[\alpha}\,dZ_{\beta]} \bar{Z}^{[\alpha}\,\overline{dZ}^{\beta]}}
{\left( Z_\alpha \bar{Z}^\alpha \right)^2}.
\end{align}$$

Here the summation convention is used to sum over Greek indices α β ranging from 0 to n, and in the last equality the standard notation for the skew part of a tensor is used:

$$Z_{[\alpha}W_{\beta]} = \tfrac12 \left(
Z_{\alpha} W_{\beta} - Z_{\beta} W_{\alpha} \right).$$

Now, this expression for ds^{2} apparently defines a tensor on the total space of the tautological bundle C^{n+1} \ {0}. It is to be understood properly as a tensor on CP^{n} by pulling it back along a holomorphic section σ of the tautological bundle of CP^{n}. It remains then to verify that the value of the pullback is independent of the choice of section: this can be done by a direct calculation.

The Kähler form of this metric is

$$\omega = \frac{i}{2}\partial\bar{\partial}\log |\mathbf{Z}|^2$$

where the $\partial, \bar\partial$ are the Dolbeault operators. The pullback of this is clearly independent of the choice of holomorphic section. The quantity log|Z|^{2} is the Kähler potential (sometimes called the Kähler scalar) of CP^{n}.

=== In bra-ket coordinate notation ===
In quantum mechanics, the Fubini–Study metric is also known as the Bures metric. However, the Bures metric is typically defined in the notation of mixed states, whereas the exposition below is written in terms of a pure state. The real part of the metric is (a quarter of) the Fisher information metric.

The Fubini–Study metric may be written using the bra–ket notation commonly used in quantum mechanics. To explicitly equate this notation to the homogeneous coordinates given above, let

$$\vert \psi \rangle = \sum_{k=0}^n Z_k \vert e_k \rangle = [Z_0:Z_1:\ldots:Z_n]$$

where $\{\vert e_k \rangle\}$ is a set of orthonormal basis vectors for Hilbert space, the $Z_k$ are complex numbers, and $Z_\alpha = [Z_0:Z_1:\ldots:Z_n]$ is the standard notation for a point in the projective space CP^{n} in homogeneous coordinates. Then, given two points $\vert \psi \rangle = Z_\alpha$ and $\vert \varphi \rangle = W_\alpha$ in the space, the distance (length of a geodesic) between them is

$$\gamma (\psi, \varphi) = \arccos
\sqrt \frac {\langle \psi \vert \varphi \rangle \;
\langle \varphi \vert \psi \rangle }
{\langle \psi \vert \psi \rangle \;
\langle \varphi \vert \varphi \rangle}$$

or, equivalently, in projective variety notation,

$$\gamma (\psi, \varphi) =\gamma (Z,W) =
\arccos \sqrt {\frac {Z_\alpha \bar{W}^\alpha \; W_\beta \bar{Z}^\beta}
{Z_\alpha \bar{Z}^\alpha \; W_\beta \bar{W}^\beta}}.$$

Here, $\bar{Z}^\alpha$ is the complex conjugate of $Z_\alpha$. The appearance of $\langle \psi \vert \psi \rangle$ in the denominator is a reminder that $\vert \psi \rangle$ and likewise $\vert \varphi \rangle$ were not normalized to unit length; thus the normalization is made explicit here. In Hilbert space, the metric can be interpreted as the angle between two vectors; thus it is occasionally called the quantum angle. The angle is real-valued, and runs from 0 to $\pi/2$.

The infinitesimal form of this metric may be quickly obtained by taking $\varphi = \psi+\delta\psi$, or equivalently, $W_\alpha = Z_\alpha + dZ_\alpha$ to obtain

$$ds^2 = \frac{\langle \delta \psi \vert \delta \psi \rangle}
{\langle \psi \vert \psi \rangle} -
\frac {\langle \delta \psi \vert \psi \rangle \;
\langle \psi \vert \delta \psi \rangle}
{{\langle \psi \vert \psi \rangle}^2}.$$

In the context of quantum mechanics, CP^{1} is called the Bloch sphere; the Fubini–Study metric is the natural metric for the geometrization of quantum mechanics. Much of the peculiar behaviour of quantum mechanics, including quantum entanglement and the Berry phase effect, can be attributed to the peculiarities of the Fubini–Study metric.

== The n = 1 case ==
When n = 1, there is a diffeomorphism $S^2\cong \mathbf{CP}^1$ given by stereographic projection. This leads to the "special" Hopf fibration S^{1} → S^{3} → S^{2}. When the Fubini–Study metric is written in coordinates on CP^{1}, its restriction to the real tangent bundle yields an expression of the ordinary "round metric" of radius 1/2 (and Gaussian curvature 4) on S^{2}.

Namely, if z = x + iy is the standard affine coordinate chart on the Riemann sphere CP^{1} and x = r cos θ, y = r sin θ are polar coordinates on C, then a routine computation shows

$$ds^2= \frac{\operatorname{Re}(dz \otimes d\bar{z})}{\left(1+|\mathbf{z}|\vphantom{l}^2\right)^2}
= \frac{dx^2+dy^2}{ \left(1+r^2\right)^2 }
= \tfrac14(d\varphi^2 + \sin^2 \varphi\,d\theta^2)
= \tfrac14 \, ds^2_{us}$$

where $ds^2_{us}$ is the round metric on the unit 2-sphere. Here φ, θ are "mathematician's spherical coordinates" on S^{2} coming from the stereographic projection r tan(φ/2) = 1, tan θ = y/x. (Many physics references interchange the roles of φ and θ.)

The Kähler form is

$$K=\frac{i}{2}\frac{dz\wedge d\bar{z}}{\left(1+z\bar{z}\right)^2}
= \frac{dx\wedge dy}{\left(1+x^2+y^2\right)^2}$$

Choosing as vierbeins $e^1=dx/(1+r^2)$ and $e^2=dy/(1+r^2)$, the Kähler form simplifies to

$$K=e^1 \wedge e^2$$

Applying the Hodge star to the Kähler form, one obtains

$$*K = 1$$

implying that K is harmonic.

== The n = 2 case ==
The Fubini–Study metric on the complex projective plane CP^{2} has been proposed as a gravitational instanton, the gravitational analog of an instanton. The metric, the connection form and the curvature are readily computed, once suitable real 4D coordinates are established. Writing $(x,y,z,t)$ for real Cartesian coordinates, one then defines polar coordinate one-forms on the 4-sphere (the quaternionic projective line) as

$$\begin{align}
r\,dr &= +x\,dx+y\,dy+z\,dz+t\,dt \\
r^2\sigma_1 &= -t\,dx-z\,dy+y\,dz+x\,dt \\
r^2\sigma_2 &= +z\,dx-t\,dy-x\,dz+y\,dt \\
r^2\sigma_3 &= -y\,dx+x\,dy-t\,dz+z\,dt
\end{align}$$

The $\sigma_1, \sigma_2, \sigma_3$ are the standard left-invariant one-form coordinate frame on the Lie group $SU(2)=S^3$; that is, they obey $d\sigma_i=2\sigma_j\wedge\sigma_k$ for $i,j,k=1,2,3$ and cyclic permutations.

The corresponding local affine coordinates are $z_1=x+iy$ and $z_2=z+it$ then provide

$$\begin{align}
z_1\bar{z}_1+z_2\bar{z}_2 &= r^2 = x^2+y^2+z^2+t^2 \\
dz_1\,d\bar{z}_1 + dz_2\,d\bar{z}_2 &= dr^{\,2} + r^2(\sigma_1^{\,2}+\sigma_2^{\,2}+\sigma_3^{\,2}) \\
\bar{z}_1\,dz_1 + \bar{z}_2\,dz_2  &= rdr + i\, r^2 \sigma_3
\end{align}$$

with the usual abbreviations that $dr^{\,2}=dr\otimes dr$ and $\sigma_k^{\,2}=\sigma_k\otimes\sigma_k$.

The line element, starting with the previously given expression, is given by

$$\begin{align}
ds^2 &= \frac{dz_j\,d\bar{z}^j}{1+z_i\bar{z}^i}
- \frac{\bar{z}^j z_i\,dz_j\,d\bar{z}^i}{(1+z_i\bar{z}^i)^2} \\[5pt]
&= \frac{dr^{\,2}+r^2(\sigma_1^{\,2}+\sigma_2^{\,2}+\sigma_3^{\,2})}{1+r^2}
- \frac{r^2dr^{\,2} + r^4 \sigma_3^{\,2}}{\left(1+r^2\right)^2} \\[4pt]
&= \frac{dr^{\,2}+r^2\sigma_3^{\,2}}{\left(1+r^2\right)^2} + \frac{r^2\left(\sigma_1^{\,2}+\sigma_2^{\,2}\right)}{1+r^2}
\end{align}$$

The vierbeins can be immediately read off from the last expression:

$$\begin{align}
e^0 = \frac{dr}{1+r^2} & & &
e^3 = \frac{r\sigma_3}{1+r^2} \\[5pt]
e^1 = \frac{r\sigma_1}{\sqrt{1+r^2}} & & &
e^2 = \frac{r\sigma_2}{\sqrt{1+r^2}}
\end{align}$$

That is, in the vierbein coordinate system, using roman-letter subscripts, the metric tensor is Euclidean:

$$ds^2=\delta_{ab} e^a\otimes e^b =
e^0 \otimes e^0 + e^1 \otimes e^1 + e^2 \otimes e^2 + e^3 \otimes e^3.$$

Given the vierbein, a spin connection can be computed; the Levi-Civita spin connection is the unique connection that is torsion-free and covariantly constant, namely, it is the one-form $\omega^a_{\;\;b}$ that satisfies the torsion-free condition

$$de^a + \omega^a_{\;\;b} \wedge e^b = 0$$

and is covariantly constant, which, for spin connections, means that it is antisymmetric in the vierbein indexes:

$$\omega_{ab} = -\omega_{ba}$$

The above is readily solved; one obtains

$$\begin{align}
\omega^0_{\;\;1} &= - \omega^2_{\;\;3} = -\frac{e^1}{r} \\
\omega^0_{\;\;2} &= - \omega^3_{\;\;1} = -\frac{e^2}{r} \\
\omega^0_{\;\;3} &= \frac{r^2-1}{r} e^3 \quad\quad
\omega^1_{\;\;2} = \frac{1+2r^2}{r} e^3 \\
\end{align}$$

The curvature 2-form is defined as

$$R^a_{\;\,b} = d\omega^a_{\;\,b} + \omega^a_{\;c} \wedge \omega^c_{\;\,b}$$

and is constant:

$$\begin{align}
R_{01} &= -R_{23} = e^0\wedge e^1 - e^2\wedge e^3 \\
R_{02} &= -R_{31} = e^0\wedge e^2 - e^3\wedge e^1 \\
R_{03} &= 4 e^0\wedge e^3 + 2 e^1\wedge e^2 \\
R_{12} &= 2 e^0\wedge e^3 + 4 e^1\wedge e^2
\end{align}$$

The Ricci tensor in vierbein indexes is given by

$$\operatorname{Ric}^a_{\;\;c}=R^a_{\;\,bcd} \delta^{bd}$$

where the curvature 2-form was expanded as a four-component tensor:

$$R^a_{\;\,b} = \tfrac12 R^a_{\;\,bcd}e^c\wedge e^d$$

The resulting Ricci tensor is constant

$$\operatorname{Ric}_{ab}=6\delta_{ab}$$

so that the resulting Einstein equation

$$\operatorname{Ric}_{ab} - \tfrac12 \delta_{ab}R + \Lambda\delta_{ab} = 0$$

can be solved with the cosmological constant $\Lambda=6$.

The Weyl tensor for Fubini–Study metrics in general is given by

$$W_{abcd}=R_{abcd} - 2\left(\delta_{ac}\delta_{bd} - \delta_{ad}\delta_{bc}\right)$$

For the n = 2 case, the two-forms

$$W_{ab}=\tfrac12 W_{abcd} e^c \wedge e^d$$

are self-dual:

$$\begin{align}
W_{01} &= W_{23} = -e^0\wedge e^1 - e^2\wedge e^3 \\
W_{02} &= W_{31} = -e^0\wedge e^2 - e^3\wedge e^1 \\
W_{03} &= W_{12} = 2 e^0\wedge e^3 + 2 e^1\wedge e^2
\end{align}$$

== Curvature properties ==
In the n = 1 special case, the Fubini–Study metric has constant sectional curvature identically equal to 4, according to the equivalence with the 2-sphere's round metric (which given a radius R has sectional curvature $1/R^2$). However, for n > 1, the Fubini–Study metric does not have constant curvature. Its sectional curvature is instead given by the equation

$$K(\sigma) = 1 + 3\langle JX,Y \rangle^2$$

where $\{X,Y\} \in T_p \mathbf{CP}^n$ is an orthonormal basis of the 2-plane σ, the mapping J : TCP^{n} → TCP^{n} is the complex structure on CP^{n}, and $\langle \cdot , \cdot \rangle$ is the Fubini–Study metric.

A consequence of this formula is that the sectional curvature satisfies $1 \leq K(\sigma) \leq 4$ for all 2-planes $\sigma$. The maximum sectional curvature (4) is attained at a holomorphic 2-plane — one for which J(σ) ⊂ σ — while the minimum sectional curvature (1) is attained at a 2-plane for which J(σ) is orthogonal to σ. For this reason, the Fubini–Study metric is often said to have "constant holomorphic sectional curvature" equal to 4.

This makes CP^{n} a (non-strict) quarter pinched manifold; a celebrated theorem shows that a strictly quarter-pinched simply connected n-manifold must be homeomorphic to a sphere.

The Fubini–Study metric is also an Einstein metric in that it is proportional to its own Ricci tensor: there exists a constant $\Lambda$; such that for all i,j we have

$$\operatorname{Ric}_{ij} = \Lambda g_{ij}.$$

This implies, among other things, that the Fubini–Study metric remains unchanged up to a scalar multiple under the Ricci flow. It also makes CP^{n} indispensable to the theory of general relativity, where it serves as a nontrivial solution to the vacuum Einstein field equations.

The cosmological constant $\Lambda$ for CP^{n} is given in terms of the dimension of the space:

$$\operatorname{Ric}_{ij} = 2(n+1) g_{ij}.$$

== Product metric ==
The common notions of separability apply for the Fubini–Study metric. More precisely, the metric is separable on the natural product of projective spaces, the Segre embedding. That is, if $\vert\psi\rangle$ is a separable state, so that it can be written as $\vert\psi\rangle=\vert\psi_A\rangle\otimes\vert\psi_B\rangle$, then the metric is the sum of the metric on the subspaces:

$$ds^2 = {ds_A}^2+{ds_B}^2$$

where ${ds_A}^2$ and ${ds_B}^2$ are the metrics, respectively, on the subspaces A and B.

== Connection and curvature ==
The fact that the metric can be derived from the Kähler potential means that the Christoffel symbols and the curvature tensors contain a lot of symmetries, and can be given a particularly simple form: The Christoffel symbols, in the local affine coordinates, are given by

$$\Gamma^i_{\;jk}=g^{i\bar{m}}\frac{\partial g_{k\bar{m}}}{\partial z^j}
\qquad
\Gamma^\bar{i}_{\;\bar{j}\bar{k}}=g^{\bar{i}m}\frac{\partial g_{\bar{k}m}}{\partial \bar{z}^\bar{j}}$$

The Riemann tensor is also particularly simple:

$$R_{i\bar{j}k\bar{l}}=g^{i\bar{m}}\frac{\partial \Gamma^\bar{m}_{\;\;\bar{j}\bar{l}}}{\partial z^k}$$

The Ricci tensor is

$$R_{\bar{i}j}= R^{\bar{k}}_{\; \bar{i}\bar{k} j} =
- \frac{\partial \Gamma^\bar{k}_{\;\bar{i}\bar{k}}}{\partial z^j}
\qquad
R_{i\bar{j}}= R^k_{\; ik \bar{j}} = - \frac{\partial \Gamma^k_{\;ik}}{\partial \bar{z}^\bar{j}}$$

== See also ==
- Non-linear sigma model
- Kaluza–Klein theory
- Arakelov height
