= Bhattacharya =

Bhattacharya or Bhattacharyya may refer to

- Bhattacharya (surname)
- Anil Kumar Bhattacharyya, Indian statistician
  - Bhattacharyya angle in statistics
  - Bhattacharyya distance in statistics
- 8348 Bhattacharyya, an asteroid
