= Hellinger =

Hellinger is a surname. Notable people with the surname include:

- Ernst Hellinger (1883–1950), German mathematician
  - Hellinger distance, used to quantify the similarity between two probability distributions
  - Hellinger integral, used to define the Hellinger distance in probability theory
- Mark Hellinger (1903–1947), American journalist, theatre columnist and film producer
  - Mark Hellinger Theatre, former Broadway theatre and cinema complex
- Martin Hellinger (1904–1988), German Nazi dentist
