= Bhattacharyya angle =

Distance between two probability measures in statistics

In statistics, Bhattacharyya angle, also called statistical angle, is a measure of distance between two probability measures defined on a finite probability space. It is defined as

$$\Delta(p,q) = \arccos \operatorname{BC}(p,q)$$

where p_{i}, q_{i} are the probabilities assigned to the point i, for i = 1, ..., n, and

$$\operatorname{BC}(p,q) = \sum_{i=1}^n \sqrt{p_i q_i}$$

is the Bhattacharya coefficient.

The Bhattacharya distance is the geodesic distance in the orthant of the sphere $S^{n-1}$ obtained by projecting the probability simplex on the sphere by the transformation $p_i \mapsto \sqrt{p_i},\ i=1,\ldots, n$.

This distance is compatible with Fisher metric. It is also related to Bures distance and fidelity between quantum states as for two diagonal states one has

$$\Delta(\rho,\sigma) = \arccos \sqrt{F(\rho, \sigma)}.$$

== See also ==
- Bhattacharyya distance
- Hellinger distance
