= Anil Kumar Bhattacharyya =

Indian statistician (1915–1996)

- Born: 1 April 1915; Bhatpara, Kolkata Bengal Presidency, British India
- Died: 17 July 1996 (aged 81)
- Citizenship: India
- Education: Rajabazar Science College (University of Calcutta)
- Known for: Bhattacharyya distance, Bhattacharyya bound
- Scientific career
- Fields: Statistician
- Workplaces: University of Calcutta, Indian Statistical Institute

Anil Kumar Bhattacharyya (1 April 1915 – 17 July 1996) was an Indian statistician who worked at the Indian Statistical Institute in the 1930s and early 40s. He made fundamental contributions to multivariate statistics, particularly for his measure of similarity between two multinomial distributions, known as the Bhattacharyya coefficient, based on which he defined a metric, the Bhattacharyya distance. This measure is widely used in comparing statistical samples in biology, genetics, physics, computer science, etc.

== Life ==
Bhattacharyya was born to Bhavanath and Lilavati, sometime in March–April 1915 (in the month Chaitra Bengali: চৈত্র of the year 1321, the exact date is not known) at Bhatpara in the district of 24 Parganas of West Bengal. His birth name was Anilkumar Bhattacharyya (does not have any middle name, his entire first name was Anilkumar, thus in all of his works his name appeared as A. Bhattacharyya). He passed the Matriculation Examination of Calcutta University in 1932 and I. Sc. Examination in 1934 from Hooghly Mohsin College. In 1936 he ranked first in the First Class at the B.A./B.Sc. examination from the same college and went over to the renowned Science College, Calcutta University for an M.Sc. in Mathematics. Here he had F. W. Levi and Raj Chandra Bose as his teachers and passed the M.A. Examination in 1938 with the first rank in the First Class.

In 1939, at Levy's suggestion, Bhattacharyya met P. C. Mahalanobis together with Bose and joined the Indian Statistical Institute as an honorary worker. In 1941, he was made a part-time lecturer in the newly formed Statistics Department of Calcutta University, headed by Mahalanobis. Here he had C. R. Rao, H. K. Nandi, and T. P. Choudhury, as his students. He went to Patna to take up the job of Statistical Officer of Bihar Government, in December 1943 and, in 1946, he returned to Calcutta to join Indian Statistical Institute as Superintending Statistician (in charge of training). Mahalanobis requested him to concurrently take classes in the Statistics Department of Presidency College. After the post was created, Bhattacharyya was made a full-time Senior Professor and Head of the Department in 1949. He occupied the post of Senior Professor until his retirement in March 1974, but in 1967 he stepped down from the leadership, apparently piqued by certain moves of the West Bengal Government's Education Department. Almost since his retirement from Government service, he had been associated with the Narendrapur Ramakrishna Mission Residential College as a guest teacher. In 1994, on the occasion of its golden jubilee celebration Department of Statistics, Presidency University (then Presidency College), released a Festschrift in honour of Professor Bhattacharyya.

== Contributions to statistics ==
Bhattacharyya has made contributions to the statistics in four directions. They are: (a) Measuring the divergence between two statistical populations (b) Characterisation of bivariate normal distributions through normal conditional distribution (c) setting up information bounds for the mean square error of estimators (not necessarily unbiased) that may not attain Fréchet–Cramér–Rao lower bound. (d) Unbiased statistics with minimum variance. Bhattacharyya also worked towards finding the distributional representations of dependent chi-square random variables.

=== Bhattacharyya distance ===
Distance between statistical distributions had been addressed in 1936 by Mahalanobis, who proposed the D^{2} metric, now known as Mahalanobis distance. Subsequently, Bhattacharyya defined a cosine metric for the distance between multinomial distributions, this work despite being submitted for publication in 1941, appeared almost five years later in Sankhya. Progress toward more general results, which defines the distance metric between two probability distributions which are absolutely continuous with respect to the Lebesgue measure, has been done by Bhattacharyya, which has come in 1942, at Proceedings of the Indian Science Congress. The final work towards this direction appeared in 1943, in the Bulletin of the Calcutta Mathematical Society.

=== Deriving the PDF of normal conditional distribution ===
One of Bhattacharyya's research concerns towards mathematical probability was the characterization of classical bivariate normal distribution through normal conditional distributions. Normal conditional distributions are bivariate continuous probability distributions whose both conditional distributions are normal. In 1943 Bhattacharyya introduced the family of normal conditional distributions further he derived the probability density function of the normal conditional distribution. In the same work, Bhattacharyya has given nine sets of sufficient conditions under which normal conditional distribution becomes classical bivariate normal distributions. Barry C. Arnold noted Bhattacharyya's remarkable contribution way back in 1943 by introducing the family of normal conditional densities and has called the normal conditional distribution through various terms such as "Bhattacharyya's normal conditionals distribution", "Bhattacharyya distribution", and "Bhattacharyya's density" etc.

=== Bhattacharyya bound ===
Bhattacharyya's other research concern was the setting of lower bounds to the variance of an unbiased estimator. His information lower bound is popularly known in the Statistical literature as the Bhattacharyya bound. The Bhattacharyya bound was extended for sequential samples as well. The convergence property of Bhattacharyya bound was well studied by other researchers. P. K. Sen studied the effectiveness of the Bhattacharyya bound over the Fréchet–Cramér–Rao lower bound in the censoring scheme.

== Works ==
- "A note on Ramamurti's problem of maximal sets", Sankhya, 6 (1942) 189 - 192.
- "On discrimination and divergence", Proc. Ind. Sc. Cong., 29th Session (1942).
- "On a measure of divergence between two statistical populations defined by their probability distributions", Bull. Cal. Math. Soc, 35 (1943) 99 - 109.
- "On some sets of sufficient conditions leading to the normal bivariate distribution", Sankhya, 6 (1943) 399 - 406.
- "A note on the distribution of the sum of chi-squares", Sankhya, 7 (1945), 27 - 28. In this paper, an expression of the distribution function of sum two dependent Chi-square random variables was given in the form of a convergent series in Laguerre polynomials.
- "On a measure of divergence between two multinomial populations", Sankhya, 7 (1946), 401 - 406.
- "On some analogues of the amount of information and their uses in statistical estimation" I, Sankhya, 8 (1946) 1 - 14.
- "On some analogues of the amount of information and their uses in statistical estimation" II, Sankhya, 8 (1947) 201 - 218.
- "Some analogues of the amount of information in statistical estimation", Proc. Ind. Sc. Cong., 34th Session (1947).
- "On some analogues of the amount of information and their uses in statistical estimation" III, Sankhya, 8 (1948) 315 - 328.
- "Unbiased statistics with minimum variance", Proc. Roy. Soc. Edin., A, 63 (1950), 69 - 77.
- "The problem of regression in statistical population admitting local parameters", Bull. Int. Stat. Inst., 33, Part II (1951), 29 - 54.
- "Some uses of the t-statistic in multivariate analysis", Proc. Ind. Sc. Cong., 38th Session (1951).
- "On some uses of the t-distribution in multivariate analysis", Sankhya, 12 (1952), 89 - 104.
- "Notes on the use of unbiased and biased statistics in the binomial population", Cal. Stat. Assoc. Bull., 5 (1954), 149 - 164.
- "Some uses of the 'amount of information' in the statistical inference", (address of the Sectional President), Proc. Ind. Sc. Cong., 46th Session (1959). An abridged form of the aforementioned presidential address (statistical section) is also available and appeared in the Calcutta Statistical Association Bulletin.
- "On a geometrical representation of probability distribution and its use in statistical inference", Cal. Stat. Assoc. Bull., 40 (1990–91), 23 - 49.
