= Helminger =

Helminger is a surname. Notable people with the surname include:

- Guy Helminger (born 1963), Luxembourgish writer, brother of Nico
- Nico Helminger (born 1953), Luxembourgish writer
- Paul Helminger (1940–2021), Luxembourgish politician

== See also ==
- Hellinger
