= Mark Pinsker =

Russian mathematician

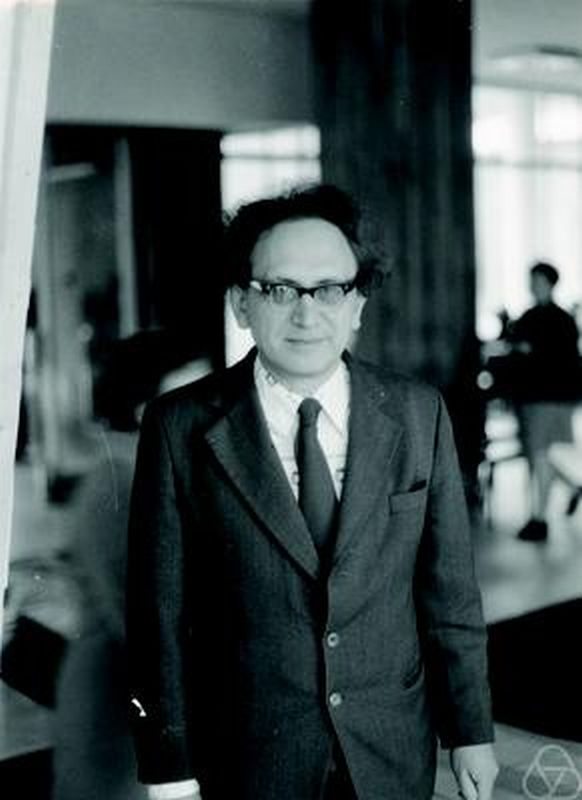
1976 in Leningrad

Mark Semenovich Pinsker (Russian: Марк Семено́вич Пи́нскер; April 24, 1925 – December 23, 2003) or Mark Shlemovich Pinsker (Russian: Марк Шлемо́вич Пи́нскер) was a noted Russian mathematician in the fields of information theory, probability theory, coding theory, ergodic theory, mathematical statistics, and communication networks.

Pinsker studied stochastic processes under A. N. Kolmogorov in the 1950s, and later worked at the Institute for Information Transmission Problems (IITP), Russian Academy of Sciences, Moscow.

His accomplishments included a classic paper on the entropy theory of dynamical systems which introduced the maximal partition with zero entropy, later known as Pinsker's partition. His work in mathematical statistics was devoted mostly to the applications of information theory, including asymptotically sufficient statistics for parameter estimation and nonparametric estimation; Pinsker's inequality is named after him. He also produced notable results in the theory of switching networks and complexity problems in coding theory.

Pinsker received the IEEE Claude E. Shannon Award in 1978, and the IEEE Richard W. Hamming Medal in 1996.

== Selected works ==
- "Theory of curves in Hilbert space with stationary increments of order " Izv. Akad. Nauk SSSR Ser. Mat., 19, 1955.
- "Динамические системы с вполне положительной и нулевой энтропией" [Dynamical systems with completely positive and zero entropy]. Doklady Akademii Nauk SSSR. 133 (5): 1025–1026. 1960.
- Information and information stability of random variables and processes, translated and edited by Amiel Feinstein, Holden-Day, San Francisco, 1964.
- L. A. Bassalygo and M. S. Pinsker, "The complexity of an optimal non-blocking commutation scheme without reorganization", Problemy Peredaci Informacii, 9(1):84–87, 1973. Translated into English in Problems of Information Transmission, 9 (1974) 64-66.
- M. S. Pinsker. "On the complexity of a concentrator", 7th International Teletraffic Conference, pages 318/1-318/4, 1973.
- "Estimation of error-correction complexity of Gallager low-density codes", Problems of Information Transmission, 11:18—28, 1976.
- "Reflections of Some Shannon Lecturers".
