= Bretagnolle–Huber inequality =

Inequality in information theory

In information theory, the Bretagnolle–Huber inequality bounds the total variation distance between two probability distributions $P$ and $Q$ by a concave and bounded function of the Kullback–Leibler divergence $D_\mathrm{KL}(P \parallel Q)$. The bound can be viewed as an alternative to the well-known Pinsker's inequality: when $D_\mathrm{KL}(P \parallel Q)$ is large (larger than 2 for instance.), Pinsker's inequality is vacuous, while Bretagnolle–Huber remains bounded and hence non-vacuous. It is used in statistics and machine learning to prove information-theoretic lower bounds relying on hypothesis testing. (Bretagnolle–Huber–Carol Inequality is a variation of Concentration inequality for multinomially distributed random variables which bounds the total variation distance.)

== Formal statement ==
=== Preliminary definitions ===
Let $P$ and $Q$ be two probability distributions on a measurable space $(\mathcal{X}, \mathcal{F})$. Recall that the total variation between $P$ and $Q$ is defined by

$$d_\mathrm{TV}(P,Q) = \sup_{A \in \mathcal{F}} \{|P(A)-Q(A)| \}.$$

The Kullback–Leibler divergence is defined as follows:

$$D_\mathrm{KL}(P \parallel Q) =
\begin{cases}
\int_{\mathcal{X}} \log\bigl(\frac{dP}{dQ}\bigr)\, dP & \text{if } P \ll Q, \\[1mm]
+\infty & \text{otherwise}.
\end{cases}$$

In the above, the notation $P\ll Q$ stands for absolute continuity of $P$ with respect to $Q$, and $\frac{dP}{dQ}$ stands for the Radon–Nikodym derivative of $P$ with respect to $Q$.

=== General statement ===
The Bretagnolle–Huber inequality says:

$$d_\mathrm{TV}(P,Q) \leq \sqrt{1-\exp(-D_\mathrm{KL}(P \parallel Q))} \leq 1 - \frac{1}{2}\exp(-D_\mathrm{KL}(P \parallel Q))$$

== Alternative version ==
The following version is directly implied by the bound above but some authors prefer stating it this way. Let $A\in \mathcal{F}$ be any event. Then

$$P(A) + Q(\bar{A}) \geq \frac{1}{2}\exp(-D_\mathrm{KL}(P \parallel Q))$$

where $\bar{A} = \Omega \smallsetminus A$ is the complement of $A$.

Indeed, by definition of the total variation, for any $A \in \mathcal{F}$,

$$\begin{align}
Q(A) - P(A) \leq d_\mathrm{TV}(P,Q) & \leq 1- \frac{1}{2}\exp(-D_\mathrm{KL}(P \parallel Q)) \\
& = Q(A) + Q(\bar{A}) - \frac{1}{2}\exp(-D_\mathrm{KL}(P \parallel Q))
\end{align}$$

Rearranging, we obtain the claimed lower bound on $P(A)+Q(\bar{A})$.

== Proof ==
We prove the main statement following the ideas in Tsybakov's book (Lemma 2.6, page 89), which differ from the original proof (see C.Canonne's note for a modernized retranscription of their argument).

The proof is in two steps:

1. Prove using Cauchy–Schwarz that the total variation is related to the Bhattacharyya coefficient (right-hand side of the inequality):

$$1-d_\mathrm{TV}(P,Q)^2 \geq \left(\int \sqrt{PQ}\right)^2$$

2. Prove by a clever application of Jensen’s inequality that

$$\left(\int \sqrt{PQ}\right)^2 \geq \exp(-D_\mathrm{KL}(P \parallel Q))$$

- Step 1:

First notice that

$$d_\mathrm{TV}(P,Q) = 1-\int \min(P,Q) = \int \max(P,Q) -1$$

To see this, denote $A^* = \arg\max_{A\in \Omega} |P(A)-Q(A)|$ and without loss of generality, assume that $P(A^*)>Q(A^*)$ such that $d_\mathrm{TV}(P,Q)=P(A^*)-Q(A^*)$. Then we can rewrite

$$d_\mathrm{TV}(P,Q) = \int_{A^*} \max(P,Q) - \int_{A^*} \min(P,Q)$$

And then adding and removing $\int_{\bar{A^*}} \max(P,Q) \text{ or } \int_{\bar{A^*}}\min(P,Q)$ we obtain both identities.

Then

$$\begin{align}
1-d_\mathrm{TV}(P,Q)^2 & = (1-d_\mathrm{TV}(P,Q))(1+d_\mathrm{TV}(P,Q)) \\
& = \int \min(P,Q) \int \max(P,Q) \\
& \geq \left(\int \sqrt{\min(P,Q) \max(P,Q)}\right)^2  \\
& = \left(\int \sqrt{PQ}\right)^2
\end{align}$$

because $PQ = \min(P,Q) \max(P,Q).$

- Step 2:

We write $(\cdot)^2=\exp(2\log(\cdot))$ and apply Jensen's inequality:

$$\begin{align}
\left(\int \sqrt{PQ}\right)^2 &= \exp\left(2\log\left(\int \sqrt{PQ}\right)\right) \\
& = \exp\left(2\log\left(\int P\sqrt{\frac{Q}{P}}\right)\right) \\
& =\exp\left(2\log\left(\operatorname{E}_P \left[\left(\sqrt{\frac{P}{Q}}\right)^{-1} \, \right] \right) \right) \\
& \geq \exp\left(\operatorname{E}_P\left[-\log\left(\frac{P}{Q} \right)\right] \right) = \exp(-D_{KL}(P,Q))
\end{align}$$

Combining the results of steps 1 and 2 leads to the claimed bound on the total variation.

== Examples of applications ==
=== Sample complexity of biased coin tosses ===
The question is How many coin tosses do I need to distinguish a fair coin from a biased one?

Assume you have 2 coins, a fair coin (Bernoulli distributed with mean $p_1=1/2$) and an $\varepsilon$-biased coin ($p_2=1/2+\varepsilon$). Then, in order to identify the biased coin with probability at least $1-\delta$ (for some $\delta>0$), at least

$$n\geq  \frac{1}{2\varepsilon^2}\log\left(\frac{1}{2\delta}\right).$$

In order to obtain this lower bound we impose that the total variation distance between two sequences of $n$ samples is at least $1-2\delta$. This is because the total variation upper bounds the probability of under- or over-estimating the coins' means. Denote $P_1^n$ and $P_2^n$ the respective joint distributions of the $n$ coin tosses for each coin, then

We have

$$\begin{align}
(1-2\delta)^2 & \leq d_\mathrm{TV}\left(P_1^n, P_2^n \right)^2 \\[4pt]
& \leq 1-e^{-D_\mathrm{KL}(P_1^n \parallel P_2^n)} \\[4pt]
&= 1-e^{-nD_\mathrm{KL}(P_1 \parallel P_2)}\\[4pt]
& = 1-e^{-n\frac{\log(1/(1-4\varepsilon^2))}{2}}
\end{align}$$

The result is obtained by rearranging the terms.

=== Information-theoretic lower bound for k-armed bandit games ===
In multi-armed bandit, a lower bound on the minimax regret of any bandit algorithm can be proved using Bretagnolle–Huber and its consequence on hypothesis testing (see Chapter 15 of Bandit Algorithms).

== History ==
The result was first proved in 1979 by Jean Bretagnolle and Catherine Huber, and published in the proceedings of the Strasbourg Probability Seminar. Alexandre Tsybakov's book features an early re-publication of the inequality and its attribution to Bretagnolle and Huber, which is presented as an early and less general version of Assouad's lemma (see notes 2.8). A constant improvement on Bretagnolle–Huber was proved in 2014 as a consequence of an extension of Fano's Inequality.

== See also ==
- Total variation for a list of upper bounds
- Bretagnolle–Huber–Carol Inequality in Concentration inequality
