= Burkill integral =

Mathematical tool for calculating areas

In mathematics, the Burkill integral is an integral introduced by Burkill (1924a, 1924b) for calculating areas. It is a special case of the Kolmogorov integral.
