= Kolmogorov integral =

In mathematics, the Kolmogorov integral (or Kolmogoroff integral) is a generalized integral introduced by Kolmogoroff (1930) including the Lebesgue–Stieltjes integral, the Burkill integral, and the Hellinger integral as special cases. The integral is a limit over a directed family of partitions, when the resulting limiting value is independent of the tags of each partition segment.
