= Kullback's inequality =

In information theory and statistics, Kullback's inequality is a lower bound on the Kullback–Leibler divergence expressed in terms of the large deviations rate function. If P and Q are probability distributions on the real line, such that P is absolutely continuous with respect to Q, i.e. P << Q, and whose first moments exist, then
$$D_{KL}(P\parallel Q) \ge \Psi_Q^*(\mu'_1(P)),$$
where $\Psi_Q^*$ is the rate function, i.e. the convex conjugate of the cumulant-generating function, of $Q$, and $\mu'_1(P)$ is the first moment of $P.$

The Cramér–Rao bound is a corollary of this result.

== Proof ==
Let P and Q be probability distributions (measures) on the real line, whose first moments exist, and such that P << Q. Consider the natural exponential family of Q given by
$$Q_\theta(A) = \frac{\int_A e^{\theta x}Q(dx)}{\int_{-\infty}^\infty e^{\theta x}Q(dx)}
= \frac{1}{M_Q(\theta)} \int_A e^{\theta x}Q(dx)$$
for every measurable set A, where $M_Q$ is the moment-generating function of Q. (Note that Q_{0} = Q.) Then
$$D_{KL}(P\parallel Q) = D_{KL}(P\parallel Q_\theta)
+ \int_{\operatorname{supp}P}\left(\log\frac{\mathrm dQ_\theta}{\mathrm dQ}\right)\mathrm dP.$$
By Gibbs' inequality we have $D_{KL}(P\parallel Q_\theta) \ge 0$ so that
$$D_{KL}(P\parallel Q) \ge
\int_{\operatorname{supp}P}\left(\log\frac{\mathrm dQ_\theta}{\mathrm dQ}\right)\mathrm dP
= \int_{\operatorname{supp}P}\left(\log\frac{e^{\theta x}}{M_Q(\theta)}\right) P(dx)$$
Simplifying the right side, we have, for every real θ where $M_Q(\theta) < \infty:$
$$D_{KL}(P\parallel Q) \ge \mu'_1(P) \theta - \Psi_Q(\theta),$$
where $\mu'_1(P)$ is the first moment, or mean, of P, and $\Psi_Q = \log M_Q$ is called the cumulant-generating function. Taking the supremum completes the process of convex conjugation and yields the rate function:
$$D_{KL}(P\parallel Q) \ge \sup_\theta \left\{ \mu'_1(P) \theta - \Psi_Q(\theta) \right\}
= \Psi_Q^*(\mu'_1(P)).$$

== Corollary: the Cramér–Rao bound ==
=== Start with Kullback's inequality ===
Let X_{θ} be a family of probability distributions on the real line indexed by the real parameter θ, and satisfying certain regularity conditions. Then
$$\lim_{h\to 0} \frac {D_{KL}(X_{\theta+h} \parallel X_\theta)} {h^2}
\ge \lim_{h\to 0} \frac {\Psi^*_\theta (\mu_{\theta+h})}{h^2},$$

where $\Psi^*_\theta$ is the convex conjugate of the cumulant-generating function of $X_\theta$ and $\mu_{\theta+h}$ is the first moment of $X_{\theta+h}.$

=== Left side ===
The left side of this inequality can be simplified as follows:
$$\begin{align}
\lim_{h\to  0} \frac {D_{KL}(X_{\theta+h}\parallel X_\theta)} {h^2} &=\lim_{h\to  0} \frac 1 {h^2} \int_{-\infty}^\infty \log \left( \frac{\mathrm dX_{\theta+h}}{\mathrm dX_\theta} \right) \mathrm dX_{\theta+h} \\
&=-\lim_{h\to  0} \frac 1 {h^2} \int_{-\infty}^\infty \log \left( \frac{\mathrm dX_{\theta}}{\mathrm dX_{\theta+h}} \right) \mathrm dX_{\theta+h} \\
&=-\lim_{h\to  0} \frac 1 {h^2} \int_{-\infty}^\infty \log\left( 1- \left (1-\frac{\mathrm dX_{\theta}}{\mathrm dX_{\theta+h}} \right ) \right) \mathrm dX_{\theta+h} \\
&= \lim_{h\to  0} \frac 1 {h^2} \int_{-\infty}^\infty \left[ \left( 1 - \frac{\mathrm dX_\theta}{\mathrm dX_{\theta+h}} \right) +\frac 1 2 \left( 1 - \frac{\mathrm dX_\theta}{\mathrm dX_{\theta+h}} \right) ^ 2
+ o \left( \left( 1 - \frac{\mathrm dX_\theta}{\mathrm dX_{\theta+h}} \right) ^ 2 \right) \right]\mathrm dX_{\theta+h} && \text{Taylor series for } \log(1-t) \\
&= \lim_{h\to  0} \frac 1 {h^2} \int_{-\infty}^\infty \left[ \frac 1 2 \left( 1 - \frac{\mathrm dX_\theta}{\mathrm dX_{\theta+h}} \right)^2 \right]\mathrm dX_{\theta+h} \\
&= \lim_{h\to  0} \frac 1 {h^2} \int_{-\infty}^\infty \left[ \frac 1 2 \left( \frac{\mathrm dX_{\theta+h} - \mathrm dX_\theta}{\mathrm dX_{\theta+h}} \right)^2  \right]\mathrm dX_{\theta+h} \\
&= \frac 1 2 \mathcal I_X(\theta)
\end{align}$$
which is half the Fisher information of the parameter θ.

=== Right side ===
The right side of the inequality can be developed as follows:
$$\lim_{h\to 0} \frac {\Psi^*_\theta (\mu_{\theta+h})}{h^2}
= \lim_{h\to 0} \frac 1 {h^2} {\sup_t \{\mu_{\theta+h}t - \Psi_\theta(t)\} }.$$
This supremum is attained at a value of t=τ where the first derivative of the cumulant-generating function is $\Psi'_\theta(\tau) = \mu_{\theta+h},$ but we have $\Psi'_\theta(0) = \mu_\theta,$ so that
$$\Psi''_\theta(0) = \frac{d\mu_\theta}{d\theta} \lim_{h \to 0} \frac h \tau.$$
Moreover,
$$\lim_{h\to 0} \frac {\Psi^*_\theta (\mu_{\theta+h})}{h^2}
= \frac 1 {2\Psi''_\theta(0)}\left(\frac {d\mu_\theta}{d\theta}\right)^2
= \frac 1 {2\operatorname{Var}(X_\theta)}\left(\frac {d\mu_\theta}{d\theta}\right)^2.$$

=== Putting both sides back together ===
We have:
$$\frac 1 2 \mathcal I_X(\theta)
\ge \frac 1 {2\operatorname{Var}(X_\theta)}\left(\frac {d\mu_\theta}{d\theta}\right)^2,$$
which can be rearranged as:
$$\operatorname{Var}(X_\theta) \ge \frac{(d\mu_\theta / d\theta)^2} {\mathcal I_X(\theta)}.$$

== See also ==
- Kullback–Leibler divergence
- Cramér–Rao bound
- Fisher information
- Large deviations theory
- Convex conjugate
- Rate function
- Moment-generating function
