= Hellinger integral =

In mathematics, the Hellinger integral is an integral introduced by Hellinger (1909) that is a special case of the Kolmogorov integral. It is used to define the Hellinger distance in probability theory.
