= Ernst Hellinger =

German mathematician (1883–1950)

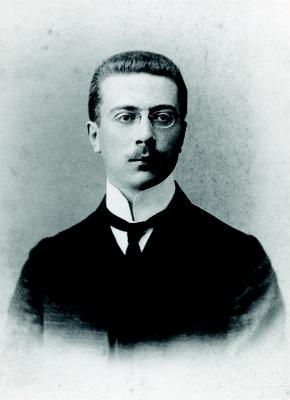
- Courtesy MFO
- Born: September 30, 1883; Striegau, Silesia Province
- Died: March 28, 1950 (aged 66); Chicago, Illinois, United States
- Education: University of Göttingen
- Known for: Hellinger distance Hellinger integral Hellinger–Toeplitz theorem
- Scientific career
- Fields: Mathematics
- Workplaces: Northwestern University
- Doctoral advisor: David Hilbert

Ernst David Hellinger (September 30, 1883 – March 28, 1950) was a German mathematician and is primarily known for his works on statistics and probability. His works include Hellinger distance and Hellinger integral which were introduced by him in 1909.

== Early years ==
Ernst Hellinger was born on September 30, 1883, in Striegau, Silesia, Germany (now Strzegom, Poland) to Emil and Julie Hellinger. He grew up in Breslau, attended school and graduated from the Gymnasium there in 1902. When he was studying at the Gymnasium, he became fascinated with mathematics, due to excellent mathematics teachers at the school.

== Academic career ==
After graduating from the Gymnasium, Ernst Hellinger entered the University of Heidelberg, but didn't completed his studies there. After Heidelberg, he studied at the University of Breslau, before completing his doctorate at the University of Göttingen in 1907 with a thesis entitled Die Orthogonalinvarianten quadratischer Formen von unendlich vielen Variablen. At Göttingen he worked with David Hilbert, one of the most influential mathematicians of the 20th century.

Hellinger taught at the University of Göttingen (1907–1909), the University of Marburg (1909–1914), and the University of Frankfurt (1914–1935).

Adolf Hitler came to power in Germany in 1933, and while they were in power the Nazis removed several Jewish scientists and mathematicians from German universities. Hellinger's family was Jewish, and he was removed from the faculty of the University of Frankfurt in 1936.

== Later years ==
On November 13, 1938, Hellinger was arrested, taken to the Festhalle, and then put into Dachau concentration camp. However, his friends were able to arrange a temporary job for Hellinger at Northwestern University at Evanston, Illinois, in the United States. He was released from the Dachau camp after six weeks, on condition that he emigrate immediately.

He joined the faculty at Northwestern University as lecturer in mathematics in 1939. He became a U.S. citizen in 1944. Promoted to professor in 1945, he became emeritus in 1949. He died on March 28, 1950, in Chicago, Illinois, United States.

== Contributions to mathematics ==
Ernst Hellinger studied integral equations, the infinite system of equations, real functions and continued fractions. A type of integral which he introduced in his dissertation became known as "the Hellinger integral", used for defining the Hellinger distance. Hellinger distance has been used to process natural language and learning word embeddings. In addition, the Hilbert–Hellinger theory of forms in infinitely many variables profoundly influenced mathematical analysis.
