= Sankhya (journal) =

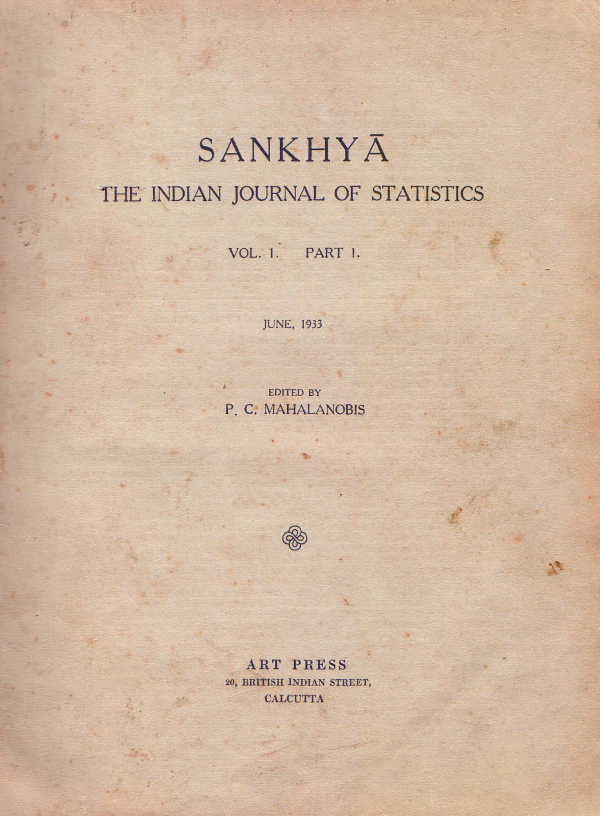
- Sankhyaː Indian Journal of Statistics, first issue, title page, June 1933
- Discipline: Statistics
- Language: English

Publication details
- History: 1933–present
- Publisher: Indian Statistical Institute (India)
- Frequency: Quarterly

Standard abbreviations
- ISO 4: Sankhya

Indexing
- ISSN: 0972-7671
- OCLC no.: 475703733

Links
- Journal homepage

Sankhyā: The Indian Journal of Statistics is a quarterly peer-reviewed scientific journal on statistics published by the Indian Statistical Institute (ISI).

It was established in 1933 by Prasanta Chandra Mahalanobis, founding director of ISI, along the lines of Karl Pearson's Biometrika. Mahalanobis was the founding editor-in-chief.

Each volume of Sankhya consists of four issues, two of them are in Series A, containing articles on theoretical statistics, probability theory, and stochastic processes, whereas the other two issues form Series B, containing articles on applied statistics, i.e. applied probability, applied stochastic processes, econometrics, and statistical computing.

Sankhya is considered as "core journal" of statistics by the Current Index to Statistics.

== Publication history ==
Sankhya was first published in June 1933. In 1961, the journal split into two series: Series A which focused on mathematical statistics and Series B which focused on statistical methods and applications. A third series, Series C, was added in 1974 and covered sample surveys and quantitative economics in alternating issues. In 1978, the quantitative economics portion became Series D. In 1981, the journal returned to two series when Series B-D were merged. In 2003, Series A and B were recombined into a single journal, but then split again in 2008. ISI began publishing Sankhya A and B via Springer in 2010.
