= Distance =

Separation between two points

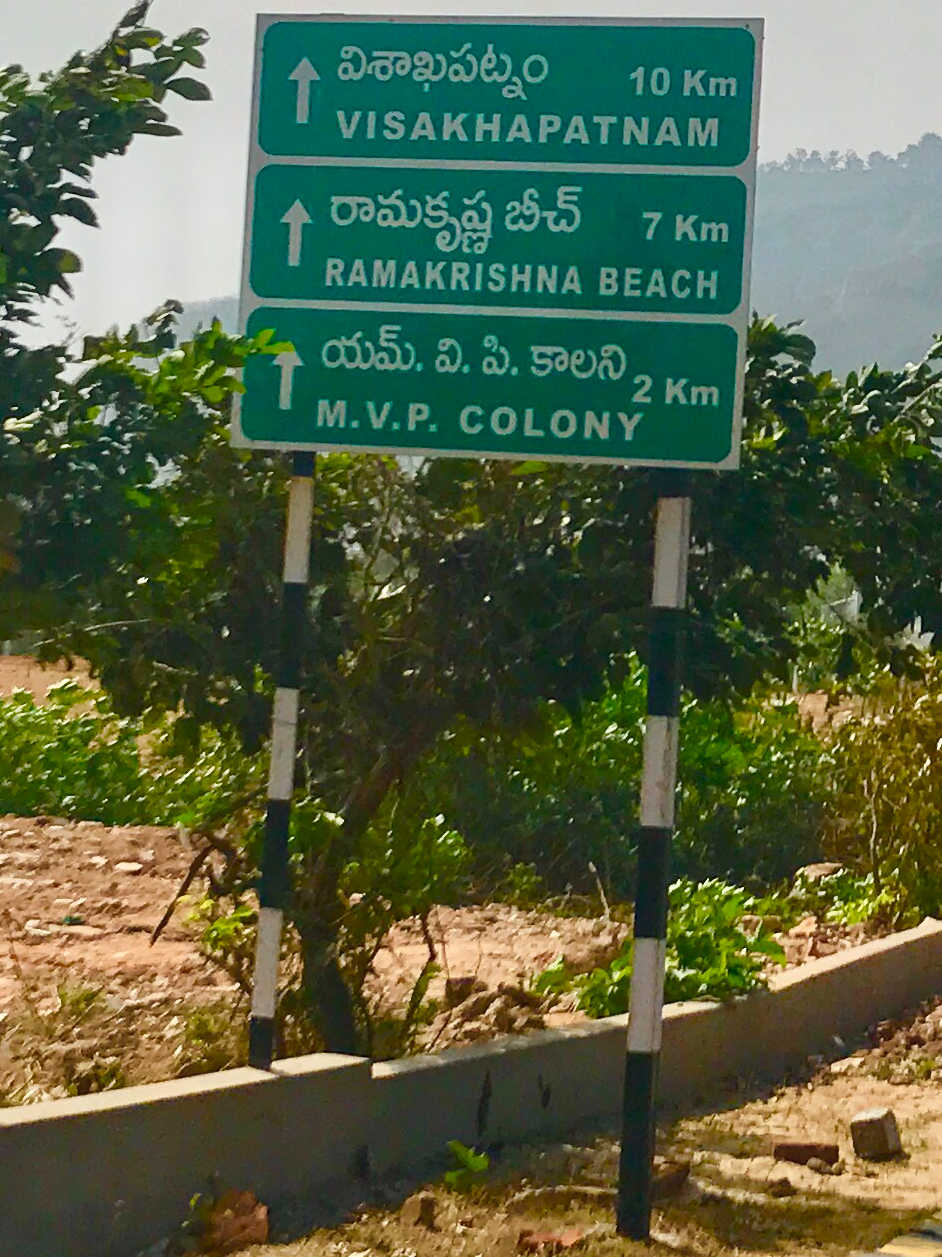
A board showing distances near Visakhapatnam, India

Distance is a numerical or occasionally qualitative measurement of how far apart objects, points, people, or ideas are. In physics or everyday usage, distance may refer to a physical length or an estimation based on other criteria (e.g. "two counties over"). The term is also frequently used metaphorically to mean a measurement of the amount of difference between two similar objects (such as statistical distance between probability distributions or edit distance between strings of text) or a degree of separation (as exemplified by distance between people in a social network). Most such notions of distance, both physical and metaphorical, are formalized in mathematics using the notion of a metric space.

In the social sciences, distance can refer to a qualitative measurement of separation, such as social distance or psychological distance.

== Distances in physics and geometry ==
The distance between physical locations can be defined in different ways in different contexts.

=== Straight-line or Euclidean distance ===
The distance between two points in physical space is the length of a straight line between them, which is the shortest possible path. This is the usual meaning of distance in classical physics, including Newtonian mechanics.

Straight-line distance is formalized mathematically as the Euclidean distance in two- and three-dimensional space. In Euclidean geometry, the distance between two points A and B is often denoted $|AB|$. In coordinate geometry, Euclidean distance is computed using the Pythagorean theorem. The distance between points (x_{1}, y_{1}) and (x_{2}, y_{2}) in the plane is given by:
$$d=\sqrt{(\Delta x)^2+(\Delta y)^2}=\sqrt{(x_2-x_1)^2+(y_2-y_1)^2}.$$
Similarly, given points (x_{1}, y_{1}, z_{1}) and (x_{2}, y_{2}, z_{2}) in three-dimensional space, the distance between them is:
$$d=\sqrt{(\Delta x)^2+(\Delta y)^2+(\Delta z)^2}=\sqrt{(x_2-x_1)^2+(y_2-y_1)^2+(z_2-z_1)^2}.$$
This idea generalizes to higher-dimensional Euclidean spaces.

==== Measurement ====
There are many ways of measuring straight-line distances. For example, it can be done directly using a ruler, or indirectly with a radar (for long distances) or interferometry (for very short distances). The cosmic distance ladder is a set of ways of measuring extremely long distances.

=== Shortest-path distance on a curved surface ===
Airline routes between Los Angeles and Tokyo approximately follow a great circle going west (top) but use the jet stream (bottom) when heading eastwards. The shortest route appears as a curve rather than a straight line because the map projection does not scale all distances equally compared to the real spherical surface of the Earth.

The straight-line distance between two points on the surface of the Earth is not very useful for most purposes, since we cannot tunnel straight through the Earth's mantle. Instead, one typically measures the shortest path along the surface of the Earth, as the crow flies. This is approximated mathematically by the great-circle distance on a sphere.

More generally, the shortest path between two points along a curved surface is known as a geodesic. The arc length of geodesics gives a way of measuring distance from the perspective of an ant or other flightless creature living on that surface.

=== Effects of relativity ===
In the theory of relativity, because of phenomena such as length contraction and the relativity of simultaneity, distances between objects depend on a choice of inertial frame of reference. On galactic and larger scales, the measurement of distance is also affected by the expansion of the universe. In practice, a number of distance measures are used in cosmology to quantify such distances.

=== Other spatial distances ===
Manhattan distance (red, blue, yellow) in contrast to Euclidean distance (green) on a grid; the Pythagorean theorem states that $l = \sqrt{(\Delta x)^2 + (\Delta y)^2}$, whereas Manhattan distance is defined as $l = \Delta x + \Delta y$.

Unusual definitions of distance can be helpful to model certain physical situations, but are also used in theoretical mathematics:

- In practice, one is often interested in the travel distance between two points along roads, rather than as the crow flies. In a grid plan, the travel distance between street corners is given by the Manhattan distance: the number of east–west and north–south blocks one must traverse to get between those two points.
- Chessboard distance, formalized as Chebyshev distance, is the minimum number of moves a king must make on a chessboard in order to travel between two squares.

== Metaphorical distances ==
Many abstract notions of distance used in mathematics, science and engineering represent a degree of difference or separation between similar objects. This page gives a few examples.

=== Statistical distances ===
In statistics and information geometry, statistical distances measure the degree of difference between two probability distributions. There are many kinds of statistical distances, typically formalized as divergences; these allow a set of probability distributions to be understood as a geometrical object called a statistical manifold. The most elementary is the squared Euclidean distance, which is minimized by the least squares method; this is the most basic Bregman divergence. The most important in information theory is the relative entropy (Kullback–Leibler divergence), which allows one to analogously study maximum likelihood estimation geometrically; this is an example of both an f-divergence and a Bregman divergence (and in fact the only example which is both). Statistical manifolds corresponding to Bregman divergences are flat manifolds in the corresponding geometry, allowing an analog of the Pythagorean theorem (which holds for squared Euclidean distance) to be used for linear inverse problems in inference by optimization theory.

Other important statistical distances include the Mahalanobis distance and the energy distance.

=== Edit distances ===
In computer science, an edit distance or string metric between two strings measures how different they are. For example, the words "dog" and "dot", which differ by just one letter, are closer than "dog" and "cat", which have no letters in common. This idea is used in spell checkers and in coding theory, and is mathematically formalized in a number of different ways, including Levenshtein distance, Hamming distance, Lee distance, and Jaro–Winkler distance.

=== Distance in graph theory ===
In a graph, the distance between two vertices is measured by the length of the shortest edge path between them. For example, if the graph represents a social network, then the idea of six degrees of separation can be interpreted mathematically as saying that the distance between any two vertices is at most six. Similarly, the Erdős number and the Bacon number—the number of collaborative relationships away a person is from prolific mathematician Paul Erdős and actor Kevin Bacon, respectively—are distances in the graphs whose edges represent mathematical or artistic collaborations.

=== In the social sciences ===
In psychology, human geography, and the social sciences, distance is often theorized not as an objective numerical measurement, but as a qualitative description of a subjective experience. For example, psychological distance is "the different ways in which an object might be removed from" the self along dimensions such as "time, space, social distance, and hypotheticality". In sociology, social distance describes the separation between individuals or social groups in society along dimensions such as social class, race/ethnicity, gender or sexuality.

== Mathematical formalization ==
Animation visualizing the function $(|x|^r + |y|^r)^{1/r}$ for various values of r.

Most of the notions of distance between two points or objects described above are examples of the mathematical idea of a metric. A metric or distance function is a function d which takes pairs of points or objects to real numbers and satisfies the following rules:

1. The distance between an object and itself is always zero.
2. The distance between distinct objects is always positive.
3. Distance is symmetric: the distance from x to y is always the same as the distance from y to x.
4. Distance satisfies the triangle inequality: if x, y, and z are three objects, then
  $$d(x,z) \leq d(x,y)+d(y,z).$$
  This condition can be described informally as "intermediate stops can't speed you up."

As an exception, many of the divergences used in statistics are not metrics.

== Distance between sets ==
The distances between these three sets do not satisfy the triangle inequality: $$d(A,B)>d(A,C)+d(C,B)$$

There are multiple ways of measuring the physical distance between objects that consist of more than one point:

- One may measure the distance between representative points such as the center of mass; this is used for astronomical distances such as the Earth–Moon distance.
- One may measure the distance between the closest points of the two objects; in this sense, the altitude of an airplane or spacecraft is its distance from the Earth. The same sense of distance is used in Euclidean geometry to define distance from a point to a line, distance from a point to a plane, or, more generally, perpendicular distance between affine subspaces.
  Even more generally, this idea can be used to define the distance between two subsets of a metric space. The distance between sets A and B is the infimum of the distances between any two of their respective points:
  $$d(A,B)=\inf_{x\in A, y\in B} d(x,y).$$
  This does not define a metric on the set of such subsets: the distance between overlapping sets is zero, and this distance does not satisfy the triangle inequality for any metric space with two or more points (consider the triple of sets consisting of two distinct singletons and their union).
- The Hausdorff distance between two subsets of a metric space can be thought of as measuring how far they are from perfectly overlapping. Somewhat more precisely, the Hausdorff distance between A and B is either the distance from A to the farthest point of B, or the distance from B to the farthest point of A, whichever is larger. (Here "farthest point" must be interpreted as a supremum.) The Hausdorff distance defines a metric on the set of compact subsets of a metric space.

== Related ideas ==
The word distance is also used for related concepts that are not encompassed by the description "a numerical measurement of how far apart points or objects are".

=== Distance travelled ===
The distance travelled or path length is the length of a specific path travelled by an object between two points. For example, it can represent the distance walked while navigating a maze or the distance marked by a milepost or an odometer on a road. It can be formalized mathematically as the arc length of the curve.

This can even be a closed distance along a closed curve, which starts and ends at the same point – such as a ball thrown straight up, or the Earth when it completes one orbit – for which the net displacement is null. The distance travelled may also be signed: a "forward" distance is positive and a "backward" distance is negative.

Circular distance is the distance traveled by a point on the circumference of a wheel, which can be useful to consider when designing vehicles or mechanical gears (see also odometry). The circumference of the wheel is 2π × radius; if the radius is 1, each revolution of the wheel causes a vehicle to travel 2π radians.

=== Displacement and directed distance ===
Distance along a path compared with displacement. The Euclidean distance is the length of the displacement vector.

The displacement in classical physics measures the change in position of an object during an interval of time. While distance is a scalar quantity, or a magnitude, displacement is a vector quantity with both magnitude and direction. In general, the vector measuring the difference between two locations (the relative position) is sometimes called the directed distance. For example, the directed distance from the New York City Main Library flag pole to the Statue of Liberty flag pole has:

- A starting point: library flag pole
- An ending point: statue flag pole
- A direction: -38°
- A distance: 8.72 km

=== Signed distance ===
In mathematics and its applications, the signed distance function or signed distance field (SDF) is the orthogonal distance of a given point x to the boundary of a set Ω in a metric space (such as the surface of a geometric shape), with the sign determined by whether or not x is in the interior of Ω. The function has positive values at points x inside Ω, it decreases in value as x approaches the boundary of Ω where the signed distance function is zero, and it takes negative values outside of Ω. However, the alternative convention is also sometimes taken instead (i.e., negative inside Ω and positive outside). The concept also sometimes goes by the name oriented distance function/field.

== See also ==
- Absolute difference
- Astronomical system of units
- Color difference
- Closeness (mathematics)
- Distance geometry problem
- Dijkstra's algorithm
- Distance matrix
- Distance set
- Engineering tolerance
- Multiplicative distance
- Optical path length
- Orders of magnitude (length)
- Proper length
- Proxemics – physical distance between people
- Psychological distance
- Signed distance function
- Similarity measure
- Social distancing
- Vertical distance

== Library support ==
- Python (programming language)
  - SciPy -Distance computations (scipy.spatial.distance)
- Julia (programming language)
  - Julia Statistics Distance -A Julia package for evaluating distances (metrics) between vectors.

== Bibliography ==
- Deza E, Deza M (2006). Dictionary of Distances. Elsevier. ISBN 0-444-52087-2.
