= Chentsov's theorem =

In information geometry, Chentsov's theorem states that the Fisher information metric is, up to rescaling, the unique Riemannian metric on a statistical manifold that is invariant under sufficient statistics.

The theorem is named after mathematician Nikolai Chentsov, who proved it in his 1981 paper.

== See also ==
- Fisher information
- Sufficient statistic
- Information geometry
