= Information projection =

Concept in information theory

In information theory, the information projection or I-projection of a probability distribution q onto a set of distributions P is

$$p^* = \underset{p \in P}{\arg\min} \operatorname{D}_{\mathrm{KL}}(p||q)$$.

where $D_{\mathrm{KL}}$ is the Kullback–Leibler divergence from q to p. Viewing the Kullback–Leibler divergence as a measure of distance, the I-projection $p^*$ is the "closest" distribution to q of all the distributions in P.

The I-projection is useful in setting up information geometry, notably because of the following inequality, valid when P is convex:

$\operatorname{D}_{\mathrm{KL}}(p||q) \geq \operatorname{D}_{\mathrm{KL}}(p||p^*) + \operatorname{D}_{\mathrm{KL}}(p^*||q)$.

This inequality can be interpreted as an information-geometric version of Pythagoras' triangle-inequality theorem, where KL divergence is viewed as squared distance in a Euclidean space.

It is worthwhile to note that since $\operatorname{D}_{\mathrm{KL}}(p||q) \geq 0$ and continuous in p, if P is closed and non-empty, then there exists at least one minimizer to the optimization problem framed above. Furthermore, if P is convex, then the optimum distribution is unique.

The reverse I-projection also known as moment projection or M-projection is

$$p^* = \underset{p \in P}{\arg\min} \operatorname{D}_{\mathrm{KL}}(q||p)$$.

Since the KL divergence is not symmetric in its arguments, the I-projection and the M-projection will exhibit different behavior. For I-projection, $p(x)$ will typically under-estimate the support of $q(x)$ and will lock onto one of its modes. This is due to $p(x)=0$, whenever $q(x)=0$ to make sure KL divergence stays finite. For M-projection, $p(x)$ will typically over-estimate the support of $q(x)$. This is due to $p(x) > 0$ whenever $q(x) > 0$ to make sure KL divergence stays finite.

The reverse I-projection plays a fundamental role in the construction of optimal e-variables.

The concept of information projection can be extended to arbitrary f-divergences and other divergences.

== See also ==
- Sanov's theorem
