= Ariel Caticha =

Professor of theoretical physics

Ariel Caticha is a professor of theoretical physics at State University of New York at Albany (SUNY Albany) and chair of its department of physics. His research interests include Information Physics (Entropic Foundations of Quantum Mechanics, Statistical Mechanics and General Relativity), Entropic and Bayesian Inference, and Information Geometry.

== Education ==
- Ph.D. California Institute of Technology
- B.Sc. and M.Sc. UNICAMP, Brazil

== Career ==
His most cited papers are

- Caticha, Ariel, and S. Caticha-Ellis. "Dynamical theory of x-ray diffraction at Bragg angles near π 2." Physical Review B 25.2 (1982): 971. (cited 125 times according to Google Scholar)
- Caticha, Ariel, and Adom Giffin. "Updating probabilities." arXiv preprint physics/0608185 (2006). (cited 116 times)
- Caticha, Ariel. "Transition-diffracted radiation and the Cerenkov emission of x rays." Physical Review A 40.8 (1989): 4322. (cited 98 times)
- Caticha, Ariel, and Roland Preuss. "Maximum entropy and Bayesian data analysis: Entropic prior distributions." Physical Review E 70.4 (2004): 046127. (cited 90 times)
- Caticha, Ariel. "Consistency, amplitudes, and probabilities in quantum theory." Physical Review A 57.3 (1998): 1572. (cited 77 times)
