= Multiplicative distance =

In algebraic geometry, $\mu$ is said to be a multiplicative distance function over a field if it satisfies

- $\mu(AB)>1.\,$
- AB is congruent to A'B' iff $\mu(AB)=\mu(A'B').\,$
- AB < A'B' iff $\mu(AB)<\mu(A'B').\,$
- $\mu(AB+CD)=\mu(AB)\mu(CD).\,$

== See also ==
- Algebraic geometry
- Hyperbolic geometry
- Poincaré disc model
- Hilbert's arithmetic of ends
