= Richard Leibler =

American mathematician and cryptanalyst (1914 - 2003)

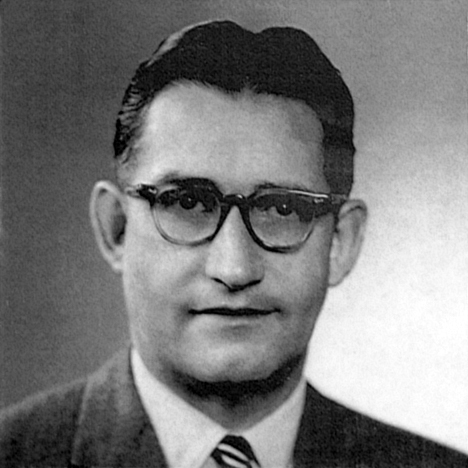
- Born: March 18, 1914; Chicago, Illinois
- Died: October 25, 2003 (aged 89); Reston, Virginia
- Education: Northwestern University (A.M., Mathematics); University of Illinois (Ph.D., Mathematics, 1939)
- Known for: Kullback–Leibler divergence
- Scientific career
- Fields: cryptanalysis, mathematics
- Workplaces: United States Navy, Princeton University, National Security Agency, Institute for Defense Analysis

Richard A. Leibler (/laɪblər/; March 18, 1914 – October 25, 2003) was an American mathematician and cryptanalyst. Richard Leibler was born in March 1914. He received his A.M. in mathematics from Northwestern University and his Ph.D. from the University of Illinois in 1939. While working at the National Security Agency, he and Solomon Kullback formulated the Kullback–Leibler divergence, a measure of similarity between probability distributions which has found important applications in information theory and cryptology. Leibler is also credited by the NSA as having opened up "new methods of attack" in the celebrated VENONA code-breaking project during 1949-1950; this may be a reference to his joint paper with Kullback, which was published in the open literature in 1951 and was immediately noted by Soviet cryptologists.

He was director of the Communications Research Division at the Institute for Defense Analyses from 1962 to 1977, during which he was the boss of Jim Simons. He was inducted into the NSA Hall of Honor for his efforts against the VENONA code.
