= Nikolai Chentsov =

Russian mathematician (1930–1992)

Nikolai Nikolaevich Chentsov (Russian: Николай Николаевич Ченцов; 19 February 1930 – 5 July 1992), written also as Nikolaj Nikolajevič Čencov, or Nikolai Chentsov, N. N. Čencov for short, was a Soviet mathematician who made important contributions to stochastic processes, convergence theory and information geometry.

== Education and career ==
Chentsov was born in Moscow and showed an early interest in mathematics. In the eighth grade (1944), he joined a school mathematics club for high school students who had just returned from evacuation at the Faculty of Mechanics and Mathematics of the Moscow State University, which was led by Alexander Kronrod and Olga Ladyzhenskaya, who was at that time a graduate student. Chentsov continued his studies in the circle under the guidance of a graduate student Eugene Dynkin, who later became his thesis advisor.

In 1947, Chentsov entered the Faculty of Mechanics and Mathematics of Moscow State University and was very actively involved in leading a mathematical club for schoolchildren and in holding school mathematical Olympiads. He was the executive secretary and secretary of the Council for Olympiads under the Rectorate of Moscow State University (at the same time as Rem Khokhlov). As a student, he became one of the authors of the three-volume book Selected Problems and Theorems of Elementary Mathematics.

Chentsov graduated with the thesis Asymptotic theory of statistical estimates in 1952 with honors from the Faculty of Mechanics and Mathematics, received an official recommendation for graduate school at Moscow State University. However, by order of Ivan Petrovsky, he was sent to the computing department of the Steklov Mathematical Institute. There, at that time, under the leadership of Mstislav Keldysh, computational work on the atomic project was unfolding, and Chentsov was assigned to the group of Israel Gelfand. At the request of Ivan Petrovsky, as an exception, Chentsov received the opportunity to combine work with study at the Steklov Institute, where he continued his studies in statistics with Nikolai Smirnov. Chentsov participated in the development of algorithms and calculations in problems of transfer and scattering of radiation according to the instructions of Ya. B. Zeldovich, A. D. Sakharov and their employees. For successful completion of work, Chentsov was awarded the Order of the Red Banner of Labor in 1956. From 1958 to 1960, Chentsov taught part-time at the Faculty of Mechanics and Mathematics of Moscow State University, where he became a professor between 1973 and 1974. Between 1959 and 1966, Chentsov was a scientific secretary of at the Keldysh Institute of Applied Mathematics of the Soviet Academy of Sciences. Since 1988, he became the head of the institute.

== Research ==
Chentsov took part in the pioneering work on the calculation of unsteady gas-dynamic flow during the movement of an axisymmetric shock wave. In this work, an original method of mathematical description of two-dimensional flow and a computational algorithm for solving similar problems were developed and implemented.

Chentsov's work on the weak convergence of random processes provided the simplest justification for the heuristic principle of Joseph L. Doob for calculating asymptotic criteria of the Kolmogorov–Smirnov test by the limiting transition from the central empirical distribution function to the Brownian bridge. A generalization of these results is given in the Chentsov's dissertation, “Justification of statistical criteria by methods of random processes” (1958).

== Bibliography ==
- Shkliarskiĭ, David Oskarovich; Chentsov, Nikolaĭ Nikolaevich (1979). Selected Problems and Theorems in Elementary Mathematics. Imported Publications, Incorporated. ISBN 978-0-8285-1535-1.
- Cencov, N. N. (2000). Statistical decision rule and optimal inference. American Mathematical Society. ISBN 9780821813478.
