= Information geometry =

Technique in statistics

The set of all normal distributions forms a statistical manifold with hyperbolic geometry.

Information geometry is an interdisciplinary field that applies the techniques of differential geometry to study probability theory and statistics. It studies statistical manifolds, which are Riemannian manifolds whose points correspond to probability distributions.

== Introduction ==
Historically, information geometry can be traced back to the work of C. R. Rao, who was the first to treat the Fisher matrix as a Riemannian metric. The modern theory is largely due to Shun'ichi Amari, whose work has been greatly influential on the development of the field.

Classically, information geometry considered a parametrized statistical model as a Riemannian, conjugate connection, statistical, and dually flat manifolds. Unlike usual smooth manifolds with tensor metric and Levi-Civita connection, these take into account conjugate connection, torsion, and Amari-Chentsov metric. All presented above geometric structures find application in information theory and machine learning. For such models, there is a natural choice of Riemannian metric, known as the Fisher information metric. In the special case that the statistical model is an exponential family, it is possible to induce the statistical manifold with a Hessian metric (i.e a Riemannian metric given by the potential of a convex function). In this case, the manifold naturally inherits two flat affine connections, as well as a canonical Bregman divergence. Historically, much of the work was devoted to studying the associated geometry of these examples. In the modern setting, information geometry applies to a much wider context, including non-exponential families, nonparametric statistics, and even abstract statistical manifolds not induced from a known statistical model. The results combine techniques from information theory, affine differential geometry, convex analysis and many other fields. One of the most perspective information geometry approaches find applications in machine learning. For example, the developing of information-geometric optimization methods (mirror descent and natural gradient descent).

The standard references in the field are Shun’ichi Amari and Hiroshi Nagaoka's book, Methods of Information Geometry, and the more recent book by Nihat Ay and others. A gentle introduction is given in the survey by Frank Nielsen. In 2018, the journal Information Geometry was released, which is devoted to the field.

== Contributors ==
The history of information geometry is associated with the discoveries of at least the following people, and many others.

- Ronald Fisher
- Harald Cramér
- Calyampudi Radhakrishna Rao
- Harold Jeffreys
- Solomon Kullback
- Jean-Louis Koszul
- Richard Leibler
- Claude Shannon
- Imre Csiszár
- Nikolai Chentsov (also written as N. N. Čencov)
- Bradley Efron
- Shun'ichi Amari
- Ole Barndorff-Nielsen
- Frank Nielsen
- Damiano Brigo
- A. W. F. Edwards
- Grant Hillier
- Kees Jan van Garderen

== Applications ==
As an interdisciplinary field, information geometry has been used in various applications.

Here an incomplete list:

- Statistical inference
- Time series and linear systems
- Filtering problem
- Quantum systems
- Neural networks
- Machine learning
- Statistical mechanics
- Biology
- Statistics
- Mathematical finance

== See also ==
- Ruppeiner geometry
- Kullback–Leibler divergence
- Stochastic geometry
- Stochastic differential geometry
- Projection filters
