= Elias Bassalygo bound =

The Elias Bassalygo bound is a mathematical limit used in coding theory for error correction during data transmission or communications.

== Definition ==
Let $C$ be a $q$-ary code of length $n$, i.e. a subset of $[q]^n$. Let $R$ be the rate of $C$, $\delta$ the relative distance and

$$B_q(y, \rho n) = \left \{ x \in [q]^n \ : \ \Delta(x, y) \leqslant  \rho n \right \}$$

be the Hamming ball of radius $\rho n$ centered at $y$. Let $\text{Vol}_q(y, \rho n) = |B_q(y, \rho n)|$ be the volume of the Hamming ball of radius $\rho n$. It is obvious that the volume of a Hamming Ball is translation-invariant, i.e. indifferent to $y.$ In particular, $|B_q(y, \rho n)| =|B_q(0, \rho n)|.$

With large enough $n$, the rate $R$ and the relative distance $\delta$ satisfy the Elias-Bassalygo bound:

$$R \leqslant 1 - H_q ( J_q(\delta))+o(1),$$

where

$$H_q(x)\equiv_\text{def} -x\log_q \left ({x \over {q-1}} \right)-(1-x)\log_q{(1-x)}$$

is the q-ary entropy function and

$$J_q(\delta) \equiv_ \text{def} \left(1-{1\over q}\right)\left(1-\sqrt{1-{q \delta \over{q-1}}}\right)$$

is a function related with Johnson bound.

== Proof ==
To prove the Elias–Bassalygo bound, start with the following Lemma:

Lemma. For $C\subseteq [q]^n$ and $0\leqslant e\leqslant n$, there exists a Hamming ball of radius $e$ with at least

$$\frac{|C|\text{Vol}_q(0,e)}{q^n}$$

codewords in it.

Proof of Lemma. Randomly pick a received word $y \in [q]^n$ and let $B_q(y, 0)$ be the Hamming ball centered at $y$ with radius $e$. Since $y$ is (uniform) randomly selected the expected size of overlapped region $|B_q(y,e) \cap C|$ is

$$\frac{|C|\text{Vol}_q(y,e)}{q^n}$$

Since this is the expected value of the size, there must exist at least one $y$ such that

$$|B_q(y,e) \cap C| \geqslant {{|C|\text{Vol}_q(y,e)} \over {q^n}} = {{|C|\text{Vol}_q(0,e)} \over {q^n}},$$

otherwise the expectation must be smaller than this value.

Now we prove the Elias–Bassalygo bound. Define $e = n J_q(\delta)-1.$ By Lemma, there exists a Hamming ball with $B$ codewords such that:

$$B\geqslant { {|C|\text{Vol}(0,e)} \over {q^n}}$$

By the Johnson bound, we have $B\leqslant qdn$. Thus,

$$| C | \leqslant qnd \cdot {{q^n} \over {\text{Vol}_q(0,e)}} \leqslant q^{n(1-H_q(J_q(\delta))+o(1))}$$

The second inequality follows from lower bound on the volume of a Hamming ball:

$$\text{Vol}_q \left (0, \left  \lfloor \frac{d-1}{2} \right \rfloor \right ) \geqslant q^{H_q \left (\frac{\delta}{2} \right )n-o(n)}.$$

Putting in $d=2e+1$ and $\delta = \tfrac{d}{n}$ gives the second inequality.

Therefore we have

$$R={\log_q{|C|} \over n} \leqslant 1-H_q(J_q(\delta))+o(1)$$

== See also ==
- Gilbert–Varshamov bound
- Hamming bound
- Johnson bound
- Plotkin bound
- Singleton bound
