= Griesmer bound =

In the mathematics of coding theory, the Griesmer bound, named after James Hugo Griesmer, is a bound on the length of linear binary codes of dimension k and minimum distance d. There is also a very similar version for non-binary codes.

== Statement of the bound ==
For a binary linear code, the Griesmer bound is:

$$n\geqslant \sum_{i=0}^{k-1} \left\lceil\frac{d}{2^i}\right\rceil.$$

== Proof ==
Let $N(k,d)$ denote the minimum length of a binary code of dimension k and distance d. Let C be such a code. We want to show that

$$N(k,d)\geqslant \sum_{i=0}^{k-1} \left\lceil\frac{d}{2^i}\right\rceil.$$

Let G be a generator matrix of C. We can always suppose that the first row of G is of the form r = (1, ..., 1, 0, ..., 0) with weight d.

$$G= \begin{bmatrix}
1 & \dots & 1 & 0 & \dots & 0 \\
\ast & \ast  & \ast &   & G' &   \\
\end{bmatrix}$$

The matrix $G'$ generates a code $C'$, which is called the residual code of $C.$ $C'$ obviously has dimension $k'=k-1$ and length $n'=N(k,d)-d.$ $C'$ has a distance $d',$ but we don't know it. Let $u\in C'$ be such that $w(u)=d'$. There exists a vector $v\in \mathbb{F}_2^d$ such that the concatenation $(v|u)\in C.$ Then $w(v)+w(u)=w(v|u)\geqslant d.$ On the other hand, also $(v|u)+r\in C,$ since $r\in C$ and $C$ is linear: $w((v|u)+r)\geqslant d.$ But

$$w((v|u)+r)=w(((1,\cdots,1)+v)|u)=d-w(v)+w(u),$$

so this becomes $d-w(v)+w(u)\geqslant d$. By summing this with $w(v)+w(u)\geqslant d,$ we obtain $d+2w(u)\geqslant 2d$. But $w(u)=d',$ so we get $2d'\geqslant d.$ As $d'$ is integral, we get $d'\geqslant \left\lceil \tfrac{d}{2} \right\rceil.$ This implies

$$n'\geqslant N\left (k-1,\left\lceil \tfrac{d}{2} \right\rceil \right ),$$

so that

$$N(k,d)\geqslant d + N\left (k-1, \left\lceil \tfrac{d}{2} \right\rceil \right ).$$

By induction over k we will eventually get

$$N(k,d)\geqslant  \sum_{i=0}^{k-1} \left\lceil\frac{d}{2^i}\right\rceil.$$

Note that at any step the dimension decreases by 1 and the distance is halved, and we use the identity

$$\left\lceil\frac{\left\lceil a/2^{k-1}\right\rceil}{2}\right\rceil = \left\lceil\frac{a}{2^k}\right\rceil$$

for any integer a and positive integer k.

== Bound for the general case ==
For a linear code over $\mathbb{F}_q$, the Griesmer bound becomes:

$$n\geqslant \sum_{i=0}^{k-1} \left\lceil\frac{d}{q^i}\right\rceil.$$

The proof is similar to the binary case and so it is omitted.

== See also ==
- Elias Bassalygo bound
- Gilbert-Varshamov bound
- Hamming bound
- Johnson bound
- Plotkin bound
- Singleton bound
