= Yasuo Komamiya =

Yasuo Komamiya (駒宮 安男, Komamiya Yasuo, October 14, 1922 – March 11, 1993) was a Japanese electrical engineer.

Komamiya graduated from the Department of Electrical Engineering, School of Engineering, Tokyo Imperial University (now University of Tokyo) in 1944. He joined the Ministry of Economy, Trade, and Industry's Electrical Testing Laboratory (ETL, now the National Institute of Advanced Industrial Science and Technology). In 1952, together with Suekane Ryota, he completed the ETL Mark I, a relay-based automatic computer, which was Japan's first digital automatic computer. He proved the Singleton-Joshi-Komamiya bound in 1953 on the size of an arbitrary block code. In 1980, he was appointed professor of Kyushu University. In 1986, he retired from Kyushu University and was appointed professor at Meiji University.
