= Even code =

If the Hamming weight of all of a binary code's codewords is even

A binary linear code is called an even code if the Hamming weight of each of its codewords is even. An even code should have a generator polynomial that includes the (x+1) minimal polynomial as a product. Furthermore, a binary code is called doubly even if the Hamming weight of all its codewords is divisible by 4. An even code which is not doubly even is said to be strictly even.

Examples of doubly even codes are the extended binary Hamming code of block length 8 and the extended binary Golay code of block length 24. These two codes are, in addition, self-dual.
