= Plotkin bound =

In the mathematics of coding theory, the Plotkin bound, named after Morris Plotkin, is a limit (or bound) on the maximum possible number of codewords in binary codes of given length n and given minimum distance d.

== Statement of the bound ==
A code is considered "binary" if the codewords use symbols from the binary alphabet $\{0,1\}$. In particular, if all codewords have a fixed length n, then the binary code has length n. Equivalently, in this case the codewords can be considered elements of vector space $\mathbb{F}_2^n$ over the finite field $\mathbb{F}_2$. Let $d$ be the minimum distance of $C$, i.e.

$$d = \min_{x,y \in C, x \neq y} d(x,y)$$

where $d(x,y)$ is the Hamming distance between $x$ and $y$. The expression $A_{2}(n,d)$ represents the maximum number of possible codewords in a binary code of length $n$ and minimum distance $d$. The Plotkin bound places a limit on this expression.

Theorem (Plotkin bound):

i) If $d$ is even and $2d > n$, then

$$A_{2}(n,d) \leq 2 \left\lfloor\frac{d}{2d-n}\right\rfloor.$$

ii) If $d$ is odd and $2d+1 > n$, then

$$A_{2}(n,d) \leq 2 \left\lfloor\frac{d+1}{2d+1-n}\right\rfloor.$$

iii) If $d$ is even, then

$$A_{2}(2d,d) \leq 4d.$$

iv) If $d$ is odd, then

$$A_{2}(2d+1,d) \leq 4d+4$$

where $\left\lfloor ~ \right\rfloor$ denotes the floor function.

== Proof of case i ==
Let $d(x,y)$ be the Hamming distance of $x$ and $y$, and $M$ be the number of elements in $C$ (thus, $M$ is equal to $A_{2}(n,d)$). The bound is proved by bounding the quantity $\sum_{(x,y) \in C^2, x\neq y} d(x,y)$ in two different ways.

On the one hand, there are $M$ choices for $x$ and for each such choice, there are $M-1$ choices for $y$. Since by definition $d(x,y) \geq d$ for all $x$ and $y$ ($x\neq y$), it follows that

$$\sum_{(x,y) \in C^2, x\neq y} d(x,y) \geq M(M-1) d.$$

On the other hand, let $A$ be an $M \times n$ matrix whose rows are the elements of $C$. Let $s_i$ be the number of zeros contained in the $i$'th column of $A$. This means that the $i$'th column contains $M-s_i$ ones. Each choice of a zero and a one in the same column contributes exactly $2$ (because $d(x,y)=d(y,x)$) to the sum $\sum_{(x,y) \in C, x \neq y} d(x,y)$ and therefore

$$\sum_{(x,y) \in C, x \neq y} d(x,y) = \sum_{i=1}^n 2s_i (M-s_i).$$

The quantity on the right is maximized if and only if $s_i = M/2$ holds for all $i$ (at this point of the proof we ignore the fact, that the $s_i$ are integers), then

$$\sum_{(x,y) \in C, x \neq y} d(x,y) \leq \frac{1}{2} n M^2.$$

Combining the upper and lower bounds for $\sum_{(x,y) \in C, x \neq y} d(x,y)$ that we have just derived,

$$M(M-1) d \leq \frac{1}{2} n M^2$$

which given that $2d>n$ is equivalent to

$$M \leq \frac{2d}{2d-n}.$$

Since $M$ is even, it follows that

$$M \leq 2 \left\lfloor \frac{d}{2d-n} \right\rfloor.$$

This completes the proof of the bound.

== See also ==
- Diamond code
- Elias Bassalygo bound
- Gilbert–Varshamov bound
- Griesmer bound
- Hamming bound
- Johnson bound
- Singleton bound
