= Bar product =

In information theory, the bar product of two linear codes C_{2} ⊆ C_{1} is defined as

$$C_1 \mid C_2 = \{ (c_1\mid c_1+c_2) : c_1 \in C_1, c_2 \in C_2 \},$$

where (a | b) denotes the concatenation of a and b. If the code words in C_{1} are of length n, then the code words in C_{1} | C_{2} are of length 2n.

The bar product is an especially convenient way of expressing the Reed–Muller RM(d, r) code in terms of the Reed–Muller codes RM(d − 1, r) and RM(d − 1, r − 1).

The bar product is also referred to as the | u | u + v | construction or (u | u + v) construction.

== Properties ==
=== Rank ===
The rank of the bar product is the sum of the two ranks:

$$\operatorname{rank}(C_1\mid C_2) = \operatorname{rank}(C_1) + \operatorname{rank}(C_2)\,$$

==== Proof ====
Let $\{ x_1, \ldots , x_k \}$ be a basis for $C_1$ and let $\{ y_1, \ldots , y_l \}$ be a basis for $C_2$. Then the set

$\{ (x_i\mid x_i) \mid 1\leq i \leq k \} \cup \{ (0\mid y_j) \mid 1\leq j \leq l \}$

is a basis for the bar product $C_1\mid C_2$.

=== Hamming weight ===
The Hamming weight w of the bar product is the lesser of (a) twice the weight of C_{1}, and (b) the weight of C_{2}:

$$w(C_1\mid C_2) = \min \{ 2w(C_1) , w(C_2) \}. \,$$

==== Proof ====
For all $c_1 \in C_1$,

$$(c_1\mid c_1 + 0 ) \in C_1\mid C_2$$

which has weight $2w(c_1)$. Equally

$$(0\mid c_2) \in C_1\mid C_2$$

for all $c_2 \in C_2$ and has weight $w(c_2)$. So minimising over $c_1 \in C_1, c_2 \in C_2$ we have

$$w(C_1\mid C_2) \leq \min \{ 2w(C_1) , w(C_2) \}$$

Now let $c_1 \in C_1$ and $c_2 \in C_2$, not both zero. If $c_2\not=0$ then:

$$\begin{align}
w(c_1\mid c_1+c_2) &= w(c_1) + w(c_1 + c_2) \\
& \geq w(c_1 + c_1 + c_2) \\
& = w(c_2) \\
& \geq w(C_2)
\end{align}$$

If $c_2=0$ then

$$\begin{align}
w(c_1\mid c_1+c_2) & = 2w(c_1) \\
& \geq 2w(C_1)
\end{align}$$

so

$$w(C_1\mid C_2) \geq \min \{ 2w(C_1) , w(C_2) \}$$

== See also ==
- Reed–Muller code
