= Rank error-correcting code =

Error-correcting code

Rank codes

Classification
- Hierarchy: Linear block code Rank code
- Block length: n
- Message length: k
- Distance: n − k + 1
- Alphabet size: Q = q^{N} (q prime)
- Notation: [n, k, d]-code

Algorithms
- Berlekamp–Massey; Euclidean with Frobenius polynomials

In coding theory, rank codes (also called Gabidulin codes) are non-binary linear error-correcting codes over not Hamming but rank metric. They described a systematic way of building codes that could detect and correct multiple random rank errors. By adding redundancy with coding k-symbol word to a n-symbol word, a rank code can correct any errors of rank up to t = ⌊ (d − 1) / 2 ⌋, where d is a code distance. As an erasure code, it can correct up to d − 1 known erasures.

A rank code is an algebraic linear code over the finite field $GF(q^N)$ similar to Reed–Solomon code.

The rank of the vector over $GF(q^N)$ is the maximum number of linearly independent components over $GF(q)$. The rank distance between two vectors over $GF(q^N)$ is the rank of the difference of these vectors.

The rank code corrects all errors with rank of the error vector not greater than t.

== Rank metric ==
Let $X^n$ be an n-dimensional vector space over the finite field $GF\left( {q^N } \right)$, where $q$ is a power of a prime and $N$ is a positive integer. Let $\left(u_1, u_2, \dots, u_N\right)$, with $u_i \in GF(q^N)$, be a base of $GF\left( {q^N } \right)$ as a vector space over the field $GF\left( {q} \right)$.

Every element $x_i \in GF\left( {q^N } \right)$ can be represented as $x_i = a_{1i}u_1 + a_{2i}u_2 + \dots + a_{Ni}u_N$. Hence, every vector $\vec x = \left( {x_1, x_2, \dots, x_n } \right)$ over $GF\left( {q^N } \right)$ can be written as matrix:

$$\vec x = \left\| {\begin{array}{*{20}c}
a_{1,1} & a_{1,2} & \ldots & a_{1,n} \\
a_{2,1} & a_{2,2} & \ldots & a_{2,n}  \\
\ldots & \ldots & \ldots & \ldots  \\
a_{N,1} & a_{N,2} & \ldots & a_{N,n}
\end{array}} \right\|$$

Rank of the vector $\vec x$ over the field $GF\left( {q^N} \right)$ is a rank of the corresponding matrix $A\left( {\vec x} \right)$ over the field $GF\left( {q} \right)$ denoted by $r\left( {\vec x; q} \right)$.

The set of all vectors $\vec x$ is a space $X^n = A_N^n$. The map $\vec x \to r\left( \vec x; q \right)$) defines a norm over $X^n$ and a rank metric:

$$d\left( {\vec x;\vec y} \right) = r\left( {\vec x - \vec y;q} \right)$$

== Rank code ==
A set $\{x_1, x_2, \dots, x_n\}$ of vectors from $X^n$ is called a code with code distance $d = \min d\left( x_i ,x_j \right)$. If the set also forms a k-dimensional subspace of $X^n$, then it is called a linear (n, k)-code with distance $d$. Such a linear rank metric code always satisfies the Singleton bound $d \leq n - k + 1$ with equality.

== Generating matrix ==
There are several known constructions of rank codes, which are maximum rank distance (or MRD) codes with d = n − k + 1. The easiest one to construct is known as the (generalized) Gabidulin code, it was discovered first by Delsarte (who called it a Singleton system) and later by Gabidulin (and Kshevetskiy ).

Let's define a Frobenius power $[i]$ of the element $x \in GF(q^N)$ as

$$x^{[i]} = x^{q^{i \mod N}}. \,$$

Then, every vector $\vec g = (g_1, g_2, \dots, g_n), ~ g_i \in GF(q^N), ~ n \leq N$, linearly independent over $GF(q)$, defines a generating matrix of the MRD (n, k, d = n − k + 1)-code.

$$G = \left\| {\begin{array}{*{20}c}
g_1 & g_2 & \dots & g_n \\
g_1^{[m]} & g_2^{[m]} & \dots & g_n^{[m]}  \\
g_1^{[2 m]} & g_2^{[2 m]} & \dots & g_n^{[2 m]}  \\
\dots & \dots & \dots & \dots  \\
g_1^{[(k-1) m]} & g_2^{[(k-1) m]} & \dots & g_n^{[(k-1) m]}
\end{array}} \right\|,$$

where $\gcd(m,N) = 1$.

== Applications ==
There are several proposals for public-key cryptosystems based on rank codes. However, most of them have been proven insecure (see e.g. Journal of Cryptology, April 2008).

Rank codes are also useful for error and erasure correction in network coding.

== See also ==
- Linear code
- Reed–Solomon error correction
- Berlekamp–Massey algorithm
- Network coding
