= Young Turks (Bell Labs) =

The Young Turks were a group of leading scientists who worked at Bell Labs, who were insatiably curious about the science behind communications. Many of them were encouraged to take risks, free from the responsibilities of applying for grants or from teaching. "We were first-class troublemakers," Richard Hamming later recalled. "We did unconventional things in unconventional ways and still got valuable results. Thus management had to tolerate us and let us alone a lot of the time."

== Members ==
- Philip Warren Anderson
- William O. Baker
- James B. Fisk
- Mervin Kelly
- John R. Pierce
- Richard Hamming
- Claude Shannon
- William Shockley
- Charles Townes
- John Tukey

== See also ==
- The Idea Factory, a 2012 book by Jon Gertner about the history of Bell Labs, including details about the Young Turks and their work
