= Covering code =

Set of "near" codewords in coding theory

In coding theory, a covering code is a set of elements (called codewords) in a space, with the property that every element of the space is within a fixed distance of some codeword.

== Definition ==
Let $q\geq 2$, $n\geq 1$, $R\geq 0$ be integers. A code $C\subseteq Q^n$ over an alphabet Q of size |Q| = q is called q-ary R-covering code of length n if for every word $y\in Q^n$ there is a codeword $x\in C$ such that the Hamming distance $d_H(x,y)\leq R$. In other words, the spheres (or balls or rook-domains) of radius R with respect to the Hamming metric around the codewords of C have to exhaust the finite metric space $Q^n$. The covering radius of a code C is the smallest R such that C is R-covering. Every perfect code is a covering code of minimal size.

== Example ==
C = {0134,0223,1402,1431,1444,2123,2234,3002,3310,4010,4341} is a 5-ary 2-covering code of length 4.

== Covering problem ==
The determination of the minimal size $K_q(n,R)$ of a q-ary R-covering code of length n is a very hard problem. In many cases, only upper and lower bounds are known with a large gap between them. Every construction of a covering code gives an upper bound on K_{q}(n, R). Lower bounds include the sphere covering bound and Rodemich's bounds $K_q(n,1)\geq q^{n-1}/(n-1)$ and $K_q(n,n-2)\geq q^2/(n-1)$. The covering problem is closely related to the packing problem in $Q^n$, i.e. the determination of the maximal size of a q-ary e-error correcting code of length n.

== Football pools problem ==
A particular case is the football pools problem, based on football pool betting, where the aim is to come up with a betting system over n football matches that, regardless of the outcome, has at most R 'misses'. Thus, for n matches with at most one 'miss', a ternary covering, K_{3}(n,1), is sought.

If $n=\tfrac12 (3^k-1)$ then 3^{n-k} are needed, so for n = 4, k = 2, 9 are needed; for n = 13, k = 3, 59049 are needed. The best bounds known as of 2011 are

n	1	2	3	4	5	6	7	8	9	10	11	12	13	14
K_{3}(n,1)	1	3	5	9	27	71-73	156-186	402-486	1060-1269	2854-3645	7832-9477	21531-27702	59049	166610-177147
K_{3}(n,2)		1	3	3	8	15-17	26-34	54-81	130-219	323-555	729	1919-2187	5062-6561	12204-19683
K_{3}(n,3)			1	3	3	6	11-12	14-27	27-54	57-105	117-243	282-657	612-1215	1553-2187

== Applications ==
The standard work on covering codes lists the following applications.

- Compression with distortion
- Data compression
- Decoding errors and erasures
- Broadcasting in interconnection networks
- Football pools
- Write-once memories
- Berlekamp-Gale game
- Speech coding
- Cellular telecommunications
- Subset sums and Cayley graphs
