= Johnson bound =

In applied mathematics, the Johnson bound (named after Selmer Martin Johnson) is a limit on the size of error-correcting codes, as used in coding theory for data transmission or communications.

== Definition ==
Let $C$ be a q-ary code of length $n$, i.e. a subset of $\mathbb{F}_q^n$. Let $d$ be the minimum distance of $C$, i.e.

$$d = \min_{x,y \in C, x \neq y} d(x,y),$$

where $d(x,y)$ is the Hamming distance between $x$ and $y$.

Let $C_q(n,d)$ be the set of all q-ary codes with length $n$ and minimum distance $d$ and let $C_q(n,d,w)$ denote the set of codes in $C_q(n,d)$ such that every element has exactly $w$ nonzero entries.

Denote by $|C|$ the number of elements in $C$. Then, we define $A_q(n,d)$ to be the largest size of a code with length $n$ and minimum distance $d$:

$$A_q(n,d) = \max_{C \in C_q(n,d)} |C|.$$

Similarly, we define $A_q(n,d,w)$ to be the largest size of a code in $C_q(n,d,w)$:

$$A_q(n,d,w) = \max_{C \in C_q(n,d,w)} |C|.$$

Theorem 1 (Johnson bound for $A_q(n,d)$):

If $d=2t+1$,

$$A_q(n,d) \leq \frac{q^n}{\sum_{i=0}^t {n \choose i} (q-1)^i + \frac{{n \choose t+1} (q-1)^{t+1} - {d \choose t} A_q(n,d,d)}{A_q(n,d,t+1)} }.$$

If $d=2t+2$,

$$A_q(n,d) \leq \frac{q^n}{\sum_{i=0}^t {n \choose i} (q-1)^i + \frac{{n \choose t+1} (q-1)^{t+1} }{A_q(n,d,t+1)} }.$$

Theorem 2 (Johnson bound for $A_q(n,d,w)$):

(i) If $d > 2w,$

$$A_q(n,d,w) = 1.$$

(ii) If $d \leq 2w$, then define the variable $e$ as follows. If $d$ is even, then define $e$ through the relation $d=2e$; if $d$ is odd, define $e$ through the relation $d = 2e - 1$. Let $q^* = q - 1$. Then,

$$A_q(n,d,w) \leq \left\lfloor \frac{n q^*}{w}  \left\lfloor \frac{(n-1)q^*}{w-1} \left\lfloor \cdots \left\lfloor \frac{(n-w+e)q^*}{e} \right\rfloor \cdots \right\rfloor \right\rfloor \right\rfloor$$

where $\lfloor ~~ \rfloor$ is the floor function.

Remark: Plugging the bound of Theorem 2 into the bound of Theorem 1 produces a numerical upper bound on $A_q(n,d)$.

== See also ==
- Elias Bassalygo bound
- Gilbert–Varshamov bound
- Griesmer bound
- Hamming bound
- Plotkin bound
- Singleton bound
