= The Art of Doing Science and Engineering =

1997 book by Richard Hamming

- Author: Richard Hamming
- Language: English
- Genre: Pedagogy
- Publisher: Gordon & Breach
- Publication date: 1997
- Publication place: United States

The Art of Doing Science and Engineering is a book by American mathematician Richard Hamming. The book comes from a course Hamming taught at the Naval Postgraduate School in Monterey, California. The book was originally published in 1997 by Gordon & Breach. It was republished in 2020 by Stripe Press.
