= Rom Varshamov =

Rom Rubenovich Varshamov
- Born: 9 April 1927; Tbilisi, Georgian Socialist Soviet Republic
- Died: 24 August 1999 (aged 72); Moscow
- Education: Tbilisi State University
- Known for: Coding Theory
- Scientific career
- Fields: Mathematician
- Doctoral advisor: Arnold Walfisz

Rom Rubenovich Varshamov (Russian: Ром Рубенович Варшамов; Born April 9, 1927, in Tbilisi; Died August 24, 1999, in Moscow) was a Soviet Armenian mathematician who worked in coding theory, especially on error-correcting codes and number theory.

Varshamov studied in Tbilisi with Arnold Walfisz (where he was Georgian students’ champion in the 100 metres), as well as in Tomsk. After that, he was a researcher in Moscow at the Steklov Institute of Mathematics with Ivan Matveyevich Vinogradov, especially on Number theory and Coding theory, and the Ministry of Radio Engineering (working in Cryptography). In 1957 he proved the Gilbert-Varshamov bound for linear codes (independently of Edgar Gilbert who proved the non-linear part). From 1968 he worked in Yerevan and was director of the Computer Centre (now Institute for Informatics and Automation Problems) of the Academy of Sciences of the Armenian SSR. He was author and co-author of more than 25 scientific articles and also a member of the Armenian National Academy of Sciences.

== Selected bibliography ==
- Varshamov, R. R.: Estimate of the number of signals in error correcting codes (Russian), Dokl. Akad. Nauk SSSR 117, 739–741, 1957

(English Translation in I. F. Blake: Algebraic Coding Theory: History and Development, Dowden, Hutchinson & Ross, 1973, pp 68–71)

- Varshamov, R. R.: A class of codes for symmetric channels and a problem from the additive theory of numbers, IEEE Trans. Inf. Theory 19, 92–95, 1973
- Varshamov, R. R.: On a method in the theory of reducibility of polynomials over a finite field, Sov. Math., Dokl. 44, No.1, 194–199, 1992; translation from Dokl. Akad. Nauk SSSR 319, No.4, 787-791, 1991
