= Generator matrix =

Matrix generating a linear code

In coding theory, a generator matrix is a matrix whose rows form a basis for a linear code. The codewords are all of the linear combinations of the rows of this matrix, that is, the linear code is the row space of its generator matrix.

== Terminology ==
If G is a matrix, it generates the codewords of a linear code C by

$$w=sG$$

where w is a codeword of the linear code C, and s is any input vector. Both w and s are assumed to be row vectors. A generator matrix for a linear $[n, k, d]_q$-code has format $k \times n$, where n is the length of a codeword, k is the number of information bits (the dimension of C as a vector subspace), d is the minimum distance of the code, and q is size of the finite field, that is, the number of symbols in the alphabet (thus, q = 2 indicates a binary code, etc.). The number of redundant bits is denoted by $r = n - k$.

The standard form for a generator matrix is,

$$G = \begin{bmatrix} I_k | P \end{bmatrix}$$,

where $I_k$ is the $k \times k$ identity matrix and P is a $k \times (n-k)$ matrix. When the generator matrix is in standard form, the code C is systematic in its first k coordinate positions.

A generator matrix can be used to construct the parity check matrix for a code (and vice versa). If the generator matrix G is in standard form,
$$G = \begin{bmatrix} I_k | P \end{bmatrix}$$
, then the parity check matrix for C is

$$H = \begin{bmatrix} -P^{\top} | I_{n-k} \end{bmatrix}$$,

where $P^{\top}$ is the transpose of the matrix $P$. This is a consequence of the fact that a parity check matrix of $C$ is a generator matrix of the dual code $C^{\perp}$.

G is a $k \times n$ matrix, while H is a $(n-k) \times n$ matrix.

== Equivalent codes ==
Codes C_{1} and C_{2} are equivalent (denoted C_{1} ~ C_{2}) if one code can be obtained from the other via the following two transformations:

1. arbitrarily permute the components, and
2. independently scale by a non-zero element any components.

Equivalent codes have the same minimum distance.

The generator matrices of equivalent codes can be obtained from one another via the following elementary operations:

1. permute rows
2. scale rows by a nonzero scalar
3. add rows to other rows
4. permute columns, and
5. scale columns by a nonzero scalar.

Thus, we can perform Gaussian elimination on G. Indeed, this allows us to assume that the generator matrix is in the standard form. More precisely, for any matrix G we can find an invertible matrix U such that
$$UG = \begin{bmatrix} I_k | P \end{bmatrix}$$
, where G and
$$\begin{bmatrix} I_k | P \end{bmatrix}$$
generate equivalent codes.

== See also ==
- Hamming code (7,4)
