= Dual code =

In coding theory, the dual code of a linear code

$$C\subset\mathbb{F}_q^n$$

is the linear code defined by

$$C^\perp = \{x \in \mathbb{F}_q^n \mid \langle x,c\rangle = 0\;\forall c \in C \}$$

where

$$\langle x, c \rangle = \sum_{i=1}^n x_i c_i$$

is a scalar product. In linear algebra terms, the dual code is the annihilator of C with respect to the bilinear form $\langle\cdot\rangle$. The dimension of C and its dual always add up to the length n:

$$\dim C + \dim C^\perp = n.$$

A generator matrix for the dual code is the parity-check matrix for the original code and vice versa. The dual of the dual code is always the original code.

== Self-dual codes ==
A self-dual code is one which is its own dual. This implies that n is even and dim C = n/2. If a self-dual code is such that each codeword's weight is a multiple of some constant $c > 1$, then it is of one of the following four types:

- Type I codes are binary self-dual codes which are not doubly even. Type I codes are always even (every codeword has even Hamming weight).
- Type II codes are binary self-dual codes which are doubly even.
- Type III codes are ternary self-dual codes. Every codeword in a Type III code has Hamming weight divisible by 3.
- Type IV codes are self-dual codes over F_{4}. These are again even.

Codes of types I, II, III, or IV exist only if the length n is a multiple of 2, 8, 4, or 2 respectively.

If a self-dual code has a generator matrix of the form $G=[I_k|A]$, then the dual code $C^\perp$ has generator matrix $[-\bar{A}^T|I_k]$, where $I_k$ is the $(n/2)\times (n/2)$ identity matrix and $\bar{a}=a^q\in\mathbb{F}_q$.
