= Error correction code =

Scheme for controlling errors in data over noisy communication channels

In computing, telecommunication, information theory, and coding theory, forward error correction (FEC) or channel coding is a technique used for controlling errors in data transmission over unreliable or noisy communication channels.

The central idea is that the sender encodes the message in a redundant way, most often by using an error correction code, or error correcting code (ECC). The redundancy allows the receiver not only to detect errors that may occur anywhere in the message, but often to correct a limited number of errors. Therefore a reverse channel to request re-transmission may not be needed. The cost is a fixed, higher forward channel bandwidth.

The American mathematician Richard Hamming pioneered this field in the 1940s and invented the first error-correcting code in 1950: the Hamming (7,4) code.

FEC can be applied in situations where re-transmissions are costly or impossible, such as one-way communication links or when transmitting to multiple receivers in multicast.

Long-latency connections also benefit; in the case of satellites orbiting distant planets, retransmission due to errors would create a delay of several hours. FEC is also widely used in modems and in cellular networks.

FEC processing in a receiver may be applied to a digital bit stream or in the demodulation of a digitally modulated carrier. For the latter, FEC is an integral part of the initial analog-to-digital conversion in the receiver. The Viterbi decoder implements a soft-decision algorithm to demodulate digital data from an analog signal corrupted by noise. Many FEC decoders can also generate a bit-error rate (BER) signal which can be used as feedback to fine-tune the analog receiving electronics.

FEC information is added to mass storage (magnetic, optical and solid state/flash based) devices to enable recovery of corrupted data, and is used as ECC computer memory on systems that require special provisions for reliability.

The maximum proportion of errors or missing bits that can be corrected is determined by the design of the ECC, so different forward error correcting codes are suitable for different conditions. In general, a stronger code induces more redundancy that needs to be transmitted using the available bandwidth, which reduces the effective bit-rate while improving the received effective signal-to-noise ratio. The noisy-channel coding theorem of Claude Shannon can be used to compute the maximum achievable communication bandwidth for a given maximum acceptable error probability. This establishes bounds on the theoretical maximum information transfer rate of a channel with some given base noise level. However, the proof is not constructive, and hence gives no insight of how to build a capacity achieving code. After years of research, some advanced FEC systems like polar code come very close to the theoretical maximum (Shannon limit) given by the Shannon channel capacity under the hypothesis of an infinite length frame.

== Method ==
ECC is accomplished by adding redundancy to the transmitted information using an algorithm. A redundant bit may be a complicated function of many original information bits. The original information may or may not appear literally in the encoded output; codes that include the unmodified input in the output are systematic, while those that do not are non-systematic.

A simplistic example of ECC is to transmit each data bit three times, which is known as a (3,1) repetition code. Through a noisy channel, a receiver might see eight versions of the output; see the table below.

| Triplet received | Interpreted as |
|---|---|
| 000 | 0 (error-free) |
| 001 | 0 |
| 010 | 0 |
| 100 | 0 |
| 111 | 1 (error-free) |
| 110 | 1 |
| 101 | 1 |
| 011 | 1 |

This allows an error in any one of the three samples to be corrected by "majority vote" or "democratic voting". The correcting ability of this ECC is:

- up to one bit of triplet in error, or
- up to two bits of triplet omitted (cases not shown in table).

Though simple to implement and widely used, this triple modular redundancy is a relatively inefficient ECC. Better ECC codes typically examine the last several tens or even the last several hundreds of previously received bits to determine how to decode the current small handful of bits (typically in groups of two to eight bits).

=== Simplified formalism ===
Formally, an error-correcting code is given by its (injective) encoding function $f : \Sigma^* \hookrightarrow \Delta^*$ which assigns to each word $u \in \Sigma^* \; \stackrel{\mathrm{def}}{=} \; \textstyle \bigcup_{n \in \mathbb N} \Sigma^n$ of a finite alphabet $\Sigma$ a unique word $w \in \Delta^* \; \stackrel{\mathrm{def}}{=} \;\textstyle \bigcup_{n \in \N} \Delta^n$ (a concatenation of letters) from the alphabet $\Delta$.

Most commonly, $f$ is a homomorphism in the sense that if $x_1 * x_2$ is the concatenation of $x_1$ and $x_2$, then we have the following:
$$f(u_1 * u_2) = f(u_1) * f(u_2)$$
This implies that it is enough to define $f(\sigma)$ for single-letter words $\sigma$. The range $\mathrm{Im}(f)$ of the function $f$ is the set of code-words. The capabilities of the code to detect and correct errors can then be understood from the distance $d = \min_{w_1, w_2 \in \mathrm{Im}(f);\ w_1 \ne w_2} d_H(w_1, w_2)$ of the code, which is the minimum Hamming distance separating any two distinct code words. A code with distance $d$ can detect errors on $k$ bits as long as $k < d$, and among those detected errors, the code can correct $l$-bit errors whenever $2l < d$.

=== Averaging noise to reduce errors ===
ECC could be said to work by "averaging noise"; since each data bit affects many transmitted symbols, the corruption of some symbols by noise usually allows the original user data to be extracted from the other, uncorrupted received symbols that also depend on the same user data.

- Because of this "risk-pooling" effect, digital communication systems that use ECC tend to work well above a certain minimum signal-to-noise ratio and not at all below it.
- This all-or-nothing tendency – the cliff effect – becomes more pronounced as stronger codes are used that more closely approach the theoretical Shannon limit.
- Interleaving ECC coded data can reduce the all or nothing properties of transmitted ECC codes when the channel errors tend to occur in bursts. However, this method has limits; it is best used on narrowband data.

Most telecommunication systems use a fixed channel code designed to tolerate the expected worst-case bit error rate, and then fail to work at all if the bit error rate is ever worse. However, some systems adapt to the given channel error conditions: some instances of hybrid automatic repeat-request use a fixed ECC method as long as the ECC can handle the error rate, then switch to ARQ when the error rate gets too high; adaptive modulation and coding uses a variety of ECC rates, adding more error-correction bits per packet when there are higher error rates in the channel, or taking them out when they are not needed.

== Types ==
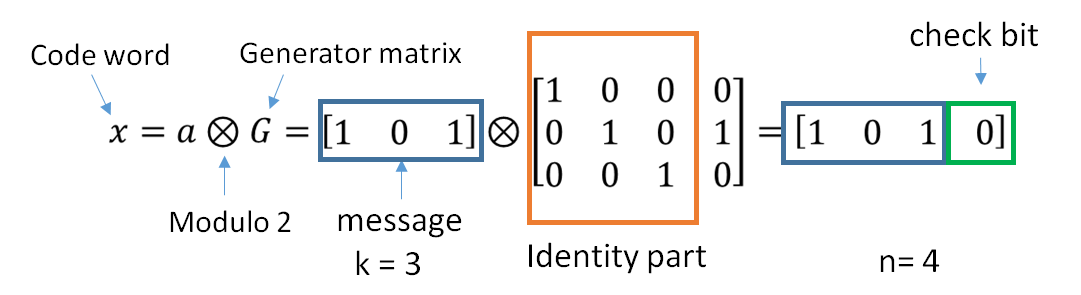
A block code (specifically a Hamming code) where redundant bits are added as a block to the end of the initial message

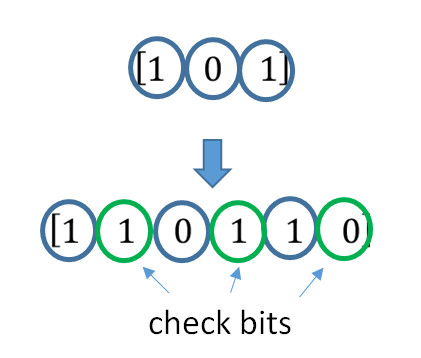
A continuous convolutional code where redundant bits are added continuously into the structure of the code word

The two main categories of ECC codes are block codes and convolutional codes.

- Block codes work on fixed-size blocks (packets) of bits or symbols of predetermined size. Practical block codes can generally be hard-decoded in polynomial time to their block length.
- Convolutional codes work on bit or symbol streams of arbitrary length. They are most often soft decoded with the Viterbi algorithm, though other algorithms are sometimes used. Viterbi decoding allows asymptotically optimal decoding efficiency with increasing constraint length of the convolutional code, but at the expense of exponentially increasing complexity. A convolutional code that is terminated is also a 'block code' in that it encodes a block of input data, but the block size of a convolutional code is generally arbitrary, while block codes have a fixed size dictated by their algebraic characteristics. Types of termination for convolutional codes include "tail-biting" and "bit-flushing".

Classical block codes are usually decoded using hard-decision algorithms, which means that for every input and output signal a hard decision is made whether it corresponds to a one or a zero bit. In contrast, convolutional codes are typically decoded using soft-decision algorithms like the Viterbi, MAP or BCJR algorithms, which process (discretized) analog signals, and which allow for much higher error-correction performance than hard-decision decoding.

Nearly all classical block codes apply the algebraic properties of finite fields. Hence classical block codes are often referred to as algebraic codes.

=== Block codes ===
There are many types of block codes; Reed–Solomon coding is noteworthy for its widespread use in compact discs, DVDs, and hard disk drives. Other examples of classical block codes include Golay, BCH, Multidimensional parity, and Hamming codes.

Hamming ECC is commonly used to correct ECC memory and early SLC NAND flash memory errors. This provides single-bit error correction and 2-bit error detection. Hamming codes are only suitable for more reliable single-level cell (SLC) NAND. Denser multi-level cell (MLC) NAND may use multi-bit correcting ECC such as BCH, Reed–Solomon, or LDPC. NOR flash typically does not use any error correction.

=== Soft codes ===
==== Low-density parity-check (LDPC) ====
Low-density parity-check (LDPC) codes are a class of highly efficient linear block codes made from many single parity check (SPC) codes. They can provide performance very close to the channel capacity (the theoretical maximum) using an iterated soft-decision decoding approach, at linear time complexity in terms of their block length. Practical implementations rely heavily on decoding the constituent SPC codes in parallel.

LDPC codes were first introduced by Robert G. Gallager in his PhD thesis in 1960, but due to the computational effort in implementing encoder and decoder and the introduction of Reed–Solomon codes, they were mostly ignored until the 1990s.

LDPC codes are now used in many recent high-speed communication standards, such as DVB-S2 (Digital Video Broadcasting – Satellite – Second Generation), WiMAX (IEEE 802.16e standard for microwave communications), High-Speed Wireless LAN (IEEE 802.11n), 10GBase-T Ethernet (802.3an) and G.hn/G.9960 (ITU-T Standard for networking over power lines, phone lines and coaxial cable). Other LDPC codes are standardized for wireless communication standards within 3GPP MBMS (see fountain codes).

==== Turbo code ====
Turbo coding is an iterated soft-decoding scheme that combines two or more relatively simple convolutional codes and an interleaver to produce a block code that can perform to within a fraction of a decibel of the Shannon limit. Predating LDPC codes in terms of practical application, they now provide similar performance.

One of the earliest commercial applications of turbo coding was the CDMA2000 1x (TIA IS-2000) digital cellular technology developed by Qualcomm and sold by Verizon Wireless, Sprint, and other carriers. It is also used for the evolution of CDMA2000 1x specifically for Internet access, 1xEV-DO (TIA IS-856). Like 1x, EV-DO was developed by Qualcomm, and is sold by Verizon Wireless, Sprint, and other carriers (Verizon's marketing name for 1xEV-DO is Broadband Access, Sprint's consumer and business marketing names for 1xEV-DO are Power Vision and Mobile Broadband, respectively).

== Describing the performance of an ECC ==
In contrast to classical block codes that often specify an error-detecting or error-correcting ability, many modern block codes such as LDPC codes lack such guarantees. Instead, modern codes are evaluated in terms of their bit error rates.

Most forward error correction codes correct only bit-flips, but not bit-insertions or bit-deletions. In this setting, the Hamming distance is the appropriate way to measure the bit error rate. A few forward error correction codes are designed to correct bit-insertions and bit-deletions, such as Marker Codes and Watermark Codes. The Levenshtein distance is a more appropriate way to measure the bit error rate when using such codes.

=== Code-rate and the tradeoff between reliability and data rate ===
The fundamental principle of ECC is to add redundant bits in order to help the decoder to find out the true message that was encoded by the transmitter. The code-rate of a given ECC system is defined as the ratio between the number of information bits and the total number of bits (i.e., information plus redundancy bits) in a given communication package. The code-rate is hence a real number. A low code-rate close to zero implies a strong code that uses many redundant bits to achieve a good performance, while a large code-rate close to 1 implies a weak code.

The redundant bits that protect the information have to be transferred using the same communication resources that they are trying to protect. This causes a fundamental tradeoff between reliability and data rate. In one extreme, a strong code (with low code-rate) can induce an important increase in the receiver SNR (signal-to-noise-ratio) decreasing the bit error rate, at the cost of reducing the effective data rate. On the other extreme, not using any ECC (i.e., a code-rate equal to 1) uses the full channel for information transfer purposes, at the cost of leaving the bits without any additional protection.

One interesting question is the following: how efficient in terms of information transfer can an ECC be that has a negligible decoding error rate? This question was answered by Claude Shannon with his second theorem, which says that the channel capacity is the maximum bit rate achievable by any ECC whose error rate tends to zero: His proof relies on Gaussian random coding, which is not suitable to real-world applications. The upper bound given by Shannon's work inspired a long journey in designing ECCs that can come close to the ultimate performance boundary. Various codes today can attain almost the Shannon limit. However, capacity achieving ECCs are usually extremely complex to implement.

The most popular ECCs have a trade-off between performance and computational complexity. Usually, their parameters give a range of possible code rates, which can be optimized depending on the scenario. Usually, this optimization is done in order to achieve a low decoding error probability while minimizing the impact to the data rate. Another criterion for optimizing the code rate is to balance low error rate and retransmissions number in order to the energy cost of the communication.

== Local decoding and testing of codes ==
Sometimes it is only necessary to decode single bits of the message, or to check whether a given signal is a codeword, and do so without looking at the entire signal. This can make sense in a streaming setting, where codewords are too large to be classically decoded fast enough and where only a few bits of the message are of interest for now. Also such codes have become an important tool in computational complexity theory, e.g., for the design of probabilistically checkable proofs.

Locally decodable codes are error-correcting codes for which single bits of the message can be probabilistically recovered by only looking at a small (say constant) number of positions of a codeword, even after the codeword has been corrupted at some constant fraction of positions. Locally testable codes are error-correcting codes for which it can be checked probabilistically whether a signal is close to a codeword by only looking at a small number of positions of the signal.

Not all locally decodable codes (LDCs) are locally testable codes (LTCs) neither locally correctable codes (LCCs), q-query LCCs are bounded exponentially while LDCs can have subexponential lengths.

== Improving performance ==
=== Concatenation (combination) ===
Classical (algebraic) block codes and convolutional codes are frequently combined in concatenated coding schemes in which a short constraint-length Viterbi-decoded convolutional code does most of the work and a block code (usually Reed–Solomon) with larger symbol size and block length "mops up" any errors made by the convolutional decoder. Single pass decoding with this family of error correction codes can yield very low error rates, but for long range transmission conditions (like deep space) iterative decoding is recommended.

Concatenated codes have been standard practice in satellite and deep space communications since Voyager 2 first used the technique in its 1986 encounter with Uranus. The Galileo craft used iterative concatenated codes to compensate for the very high error rate conditions caused by having a failed antenna.

=== Interleaving ===
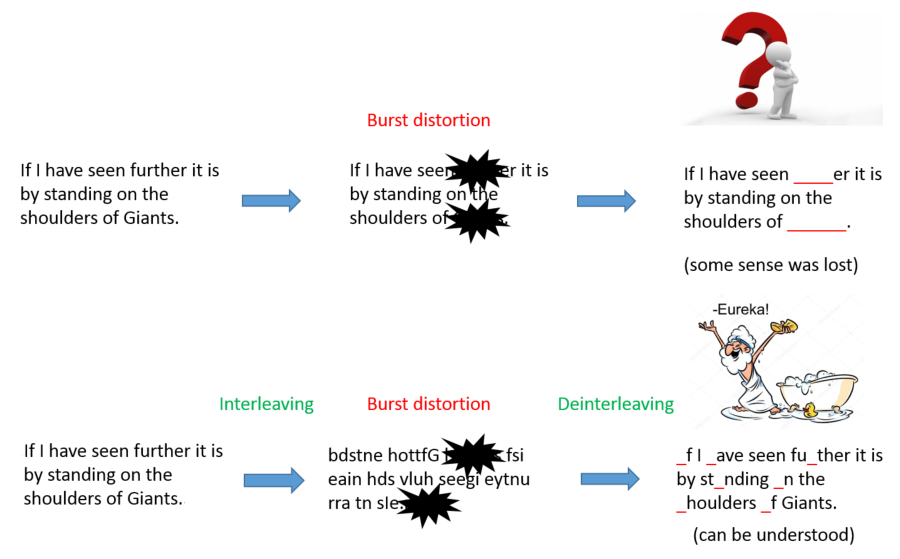
A short illustration of the interleaving idea

Interleaving is frequently used in digital communication and storage systems to improve the performance of forward error correcting codes. Many communication channels are not memoryless: errors typically occur in bursts rather than independently. If the number of errors within a code word exceeds the error-correcting code's capability, it fails to recover the original code word. Interleaving alleviates this problem by shuffling source symbols across several code words, thereby creating a more uniform distribution of errors. Therefore, interleaving is widely used for burst error-correction.

The analysis of modern iterated codes, like turbo codes and LDPC codes, typically assumes an independent distribution of errors. Systems using LDPC codes therefore typically employ additional interleaving across the symbols within a code word.

For turbo codes, an interleaver is an integral component and its proper design is crucial for good performance. The iterative decoding algorithm works best when there are not short cycles in the factor graph that represents the decoder; the interleaver is chosen to avoid short cycles.

Interleaver designs include:

- rectangular (or uniform) interleavers (similar to the method using skip factors described above)
- convolutional interleavers
- random interleavers (where the interleaver is a known random permutation)
- S-random interleaver (where the interleaver is a known random permutation with the constraint that no input symbols within distance S appear within a distance of S in the output).
- a contention-free quadratic permutation polynomial (QPP). An example of use is in the 3GPP Long Term Evolution mobile telecommunication standard.

In multi-carrier communication systems, interleaving across carriers may be employed to provide frequency diversity, e.g., to mitigate frequency-selective fading or narrowband interference.

==== Interleaving example ====
Transmission without interleaving:

Error-free message:                                 aaaabbbbccccddddeeeeffffgggg
Transmission with a burst error:                    aaaabbbbccc____deeeeffffgggg

Here, each group of the same letter represents a 4-bit one-bit error-correcting codeword. The codeword cccc is altered in one bit and can be corrected, but the codeword dddd is altered in three bits, so either it cannot be decoded at all or it might be decoded incorrectly.

With interleaving:

Error-free code words:                              aaaabbbbccccddddeeeeffffgggg
Interleaved:                                        abcdefgabcdefgabcdefgabcdefg
Transmission with a burst error:                    abcdefgabcd____bcdefgabcdefg
Received code words after deinterleaving:           aa_abbbbccccdddde_eef_ffg_gg

In each of the codewords "aaaa", "eeee", "ffff", and "gggg", only one bit is altered, so one-bit error-correcting code will decode everything correctly.

Transmission without interleaving:

Original transmitted sentence:                      ThisIsAnExampleOfInterleaving
Received sentence with a burst error:               ThisIs______pleOfInterleaving

The term "AnExample" ends up mostly unintelligible and difficult to correct.

With interleaving:

Transmitted sentence:                               ThisIsAnExampleOfInterleaving...
Error-free transmission:                            TIEpfeaghsxlIrv.iAaenli.snmOten.
Received sentence with a burst error:               TIEpfe______Irv.iAaenli.snmOten.
Received sentence after deinterleaving:             T_isI_AnE_amp_eOfInterle_vin_...

No word is completely lost and the missing letters can be recovered with minimal guesswork.

==== Disadvantages of interleaving ====
Use of interleaving techniques increases total delay. This is because the entire interleaved block must be received before the packets can be decoded. Also interleavers hide the structure of errors; without an interleaver, more advanced decoding algorithms can take advantage of the error structure and achieve more reliable communication than a simpler decoder combined with an interleaver. An example of such an algorithm is based on neural network structures.

== Software for error-correcting codes ==
Simulating the behaviour of error-correcting codes (ECCs) in software is a common practice to design, validate and improve ECCs. The upcoming wireless 5G standard raises a new range of applications for the software ECCs: the Cloud Radio Access Networks (C-RAN) in a Software-defined radio (SDR) context. The idea is to directly use software ECCs in the communications. For instance in the 5G, the software ECCs could be located in the cloud and the antennas connected to this computing resources: improving this way the flexibility of the communication network and eventually increasing the energy efficiency of the system.

In this context, there are various available Open-source software listed below (non exhaustive).

- AFF3CT(A Fast Forward Error Correction Toolbox): a full communication chain in C++ (many supported codes like Turbo, LDPC, Polar codes, etc.), very fast and specialized on channel coding (can be used as a program for simulations or as a library for the SDR).
- IT++: a C++ library of classes and functions for linear algebra, numerical optimization, signal processing, communications, and statistics.
- OpenAir: implementation (in C) of the 3GPP specifications concerning the Evolved Packet Core Networks.

== List of error-correcting codes ==
Hard codes
| Code | Distance | Detectable errors (bits) | Correctable errors (bits) |
|---|---|---|---|
| Parity (guess needed on error) | 2 | 1 | 0 |
| Triple modular redundancy | 3 | 2 | 1 |
| Perfect Hamming such as Hamming(7,4) | 3 | 2 | 1 |
| SECDED: extended Hamming such as (39,32), (72,64) | 4 | 3 | 1 |
| DECTED: Nordstrom-Robinson code | 6 | 5 | 2 |
| Perfect binary Golay code | 7 | 6 | 3 |
| TECFED: Extended binary Golay code | 8 | 7 | 3 |

In the table above, for an error-correcting code of minimal Hamming distance $d$, the maximum number of errors that the code can detect is given by $d-1$ while the maximal number of errors that it can correct is given by $\left\lfloor \frac{d-1}{2}\right\rfloor$.

- AN codes
- Algebraic geometry code
- BCH code, which can be designed to correct any arbitrary number of errors per code block.
- Barker code used for radar, telemetry, ultra sound, Wifi, DSSS mobile phone networks, GPS etc.
- Berger code
- Constant-weight code
- Convolutional code
- Expander codes
- Group codes
- Golay codes, of which the Binary Golay code is of practical interest
- Goppa code, used in the McEliece cryptosystem
- Hadamard code
- Hagelbarger code
- Hamming code
- Latin square based code for non-white noise (prevalent for example in broadband over powerlines)
- Lexicographic code
- Linear Network Coding, a type of erasure correcting code across networks instead of point-to-point links
- Long code
- Low-density parity-check code, also known as Gallager code, as the archetype for sparse graph codes
- LT code, which is a near-optimal rateless erasure correcting code (Fountain code)
- m of n codes
- Nordstrom-Robinson code, used in Geometry and Group Theory
- Online code, a near-optimal rateless erasure correcting code
- Polar code (coding theory)
- Raptor code, a near-optimal rateless erasure correcting code
- Reed–Solomon error correction
- Reed–Muller code
- Repeat-accumulate code
- Repetition codes, such as Triple modular redundancy
- Spinal code, a rateless, nonlinear code based on pseudo-random hash functions
- Tornado code, a near-optimal erasure correcting code, and the precursor to Fountain codes
- Turbo code
- Cyclic redundancy checks (CRCs) can correct 1-bit errors for messages at most $2^{n-1}-1$ bits long for optimal generator polynomials of degree $n$, see Mathematics of cyclic redundancy checks § Bitfilters
- Locally Recoverable Codes
- Message authentication code

== See also ==
- Burst error-correcting code
- Code rate
- Erasure codes
- Error detection and correction
- Error-correcting codes with feedback
- Linear code
- Quantum error correction
- Soft-decision decoder
