= Preparata =

Preparata may refer to:

- Preparata code, a non-linear double-error-correcting code
- Franco P. Preparata, Italian computer scientist
- Giuliano Preparata (1942–2000), Italian physicist
