= Mariner 9 =

First spacecraft to enter orbit around Mars (1971–1972)

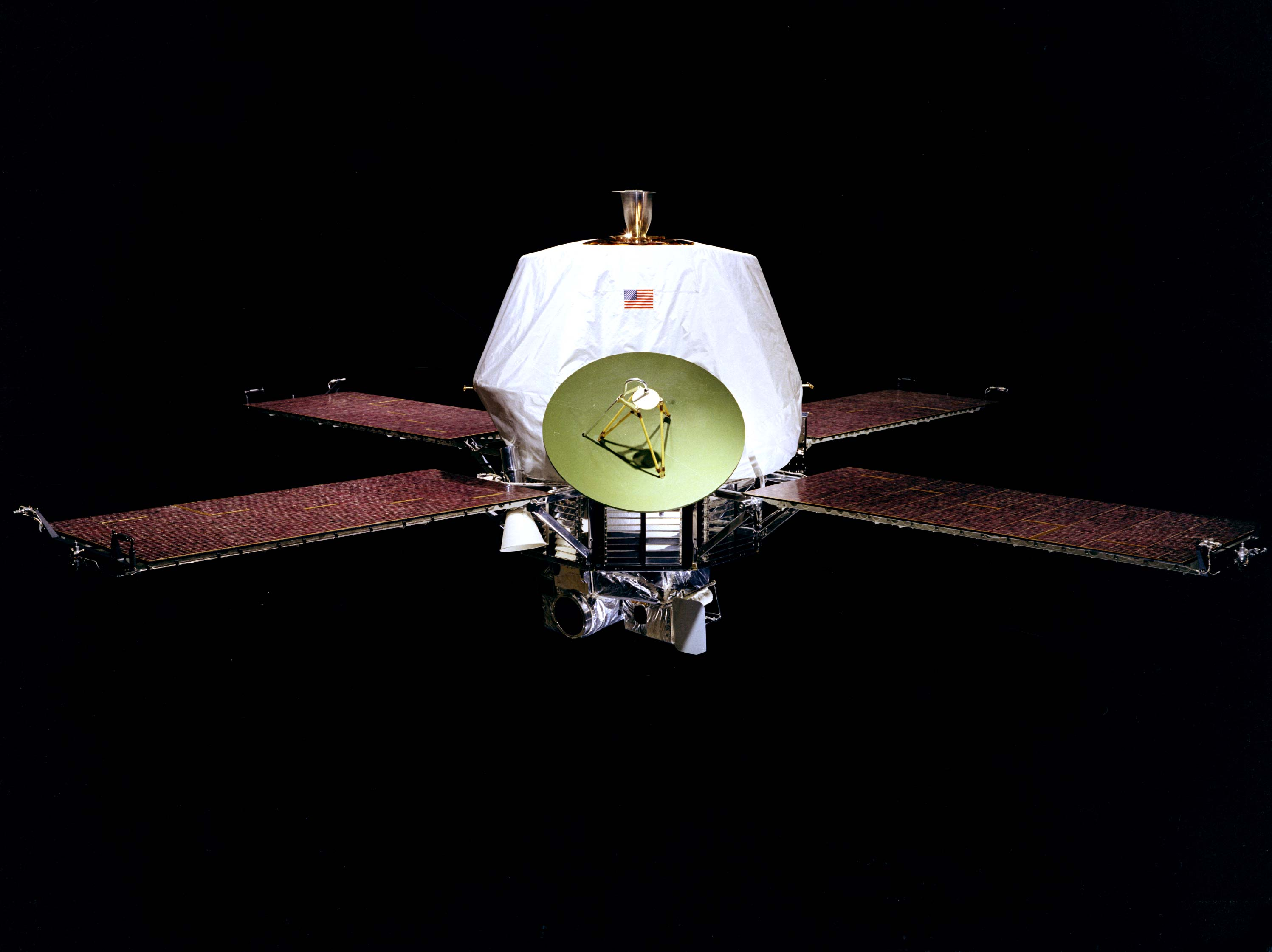
- Mission type: Mars orbiter
- Operator: NASA / JPL
- COSPAR ID: 1971-051A
- SATCAT no.: 5261
- Mission duration: 1 year, 4 months and 27 days

Spacecraft properties
- Spacecraft: Mariner-I
- Manufacturer: Jet Propulsion Laboratory
- Launch mass: 997.9 kilograms (2,200 lb)
- Dry mass: 558.8 kilograms (1,232 lb)
- Power: 500 watts

Start of mission
- Launch date: May 30, 1971, 22:23:04 UTC
- Rocket: Atlas SLV-3C Centaur-D
- Launch site: Cape Canaveral

End of mission
- Disposal: Decommissioned
- Deactivated: October 27, 1972
- Decay date: c. October 2022

Orbital parameters
- Reference system: Areocentric
- Eccentricity: 0.6014
- Periareion altitude: 1,650 km (1,030 mi)
- Apoareion altitude: 16,860 km (10,480 mi)
- Inclination: 64.4 degrees
- Period: 11.9 hours / 719.47 minutes
- Epoch: 29 December 1971, 19:00:00 UTC

Mars orbiter
- Orbital insertion: November 14, 1971, 00:42:00 UTC

Mariner 9 (Mariner Mars '71 / Mariner-I) was a robotic spacecraft that contributed greatly to the exploration of Mars and was part of the NASA Mariner program. Mariner 9 was launched toward Mars on May 30, 1971, from LC-36B at Cape Canaveral Air Force Station, Florida, and reached the planet on November 14 of the same year, becoming the first spacecraft to orbit another planet – only narrowly beating the Soviet probes Mars 2 (launched May 19) and Mars 3 (launched May 28), both of which arrived at Mars only weeks later.

After the occurrence of dust storms on the planet for several months following its arrival, the orbiter managed to send back clear pictures of the surface. Mariner 9 successfully returned 7,329 images, covering 85% of Mars's surface, over the course of its mission, which concluded in October 1972.

== Background ==
Every 26 months, Mars and the Earth are in orbital positions in relation to each other such that a minimum of thrust is required for an exploratory mission, thus maximizing the amount of payload that can be launched. The Mariner Mars 1971 Program was initiated in September 1968, calling for twin spacecraft to be launched during the 1971 opportunity. These identical probes would follow up the reconnaissances made by Mariner 4 (which encountered Mars in 1965) and Mariner 6 and Mariner 7 (1969), which, due to the limited scopes of their flybys, had returned an incomplete (and as it turned out) misleading understanding of the Red Planet. Due to a happenstance of timing, all of the three probes (with the partial exception of Mariner 7, which did return intriguing pictures of Mars' southern polar region) had captured and transmitted photos of portions of Mars that were highly cratered and resembled the Moon. Had any of the three spacecraft encountered Mars six hours earlier or later, the impression that scientists had of Mars would have been much different.

Mariner 9 was designed to continue the atmospheric studies begun by Mariner 6 and 7, and to map over 70% of the Martian surface from the lowest altitude (1,500 kilometers (930 mi)) and at the highest resolutions (from 1 kilometer to 100 meters (1,100 to 110 yards) per pixel) of any Mars mission up to that point. An infrared radiometer was included to detect heat sources in search of evidence of volcanic activity. It was to study temporal changes in the Martian atmosphere and surface. Mars's two moons, Deimos and Phobos, were also to be analyzed. Mariner 9 more than met its objectives.

Under original plans, a dual mission was to be flown like Mariners 6–7, however the launch failure of Mariner 8 ruined this scheme and forced NASA planners to fall back on a simpler one-probe mission. NASA still held out hope that another Mariner probe and Atlas-Centaur could be readied before the 1971 Mars launch window closed. A few logistical problems emerged, including the lack of an available Centaur payload shroud of the correct configuration for the Mariner probes, however there was a shroud in NASA's inventory which could be modified. Convair also had an available Centaur stage on hand and could have an Atlas readied in time, but the idea was ultimately abandoned for lack of funding.

With two orbiters, the NASA plan had been for one of them to go into a polar orbit around Mars to the hitherto unexplored polar caps and to comprehensively map the planet; this would satisfy planetary scientist Bruce Murray and his CalTech team. The other, in service of geologist Carl Sagan's Cornell University team, would orbit at a lower inclination—50°—so as to closely map the Mars' equatorial and medium regions to determine what caused the seasonal markings that darkened the surface. Once Mariner 8 was lost, Mariner 9 was reconfigured to orbit Mars at a compromise inclination of 65°.

== Spacecraft and subsystems ==
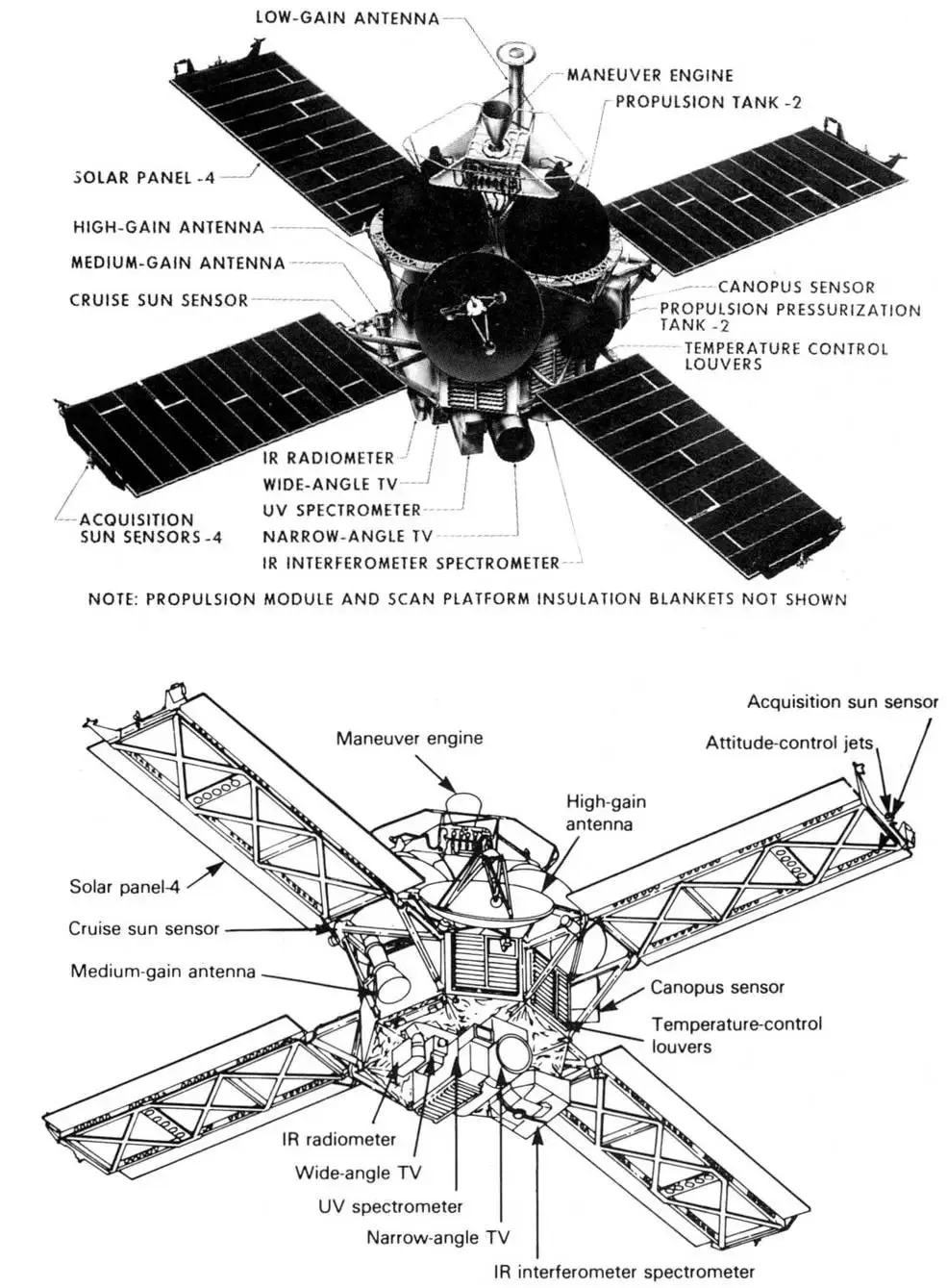
A schematic of Mariner 8/9, showing the major components and features

Mariner 9 carried an instrument payload similar to Mariners 6 and 7, but because of the need for a larger propulsion system to control the spacecraft in Martian orbit, it weighed more than Mariners 6 and 7 combined (Mariner 6 and Mariner 7 weighed 413 kilograms while Mariner 9 weighed 997.9 kilograms).

=== Power ===
The power for the spacecraft was provided by a total of 14,742 solar cells, being distributed between 4 solar panels, which in total resulted in 7.7 meters of solar panels being present in the spacecraft. The solar panels produced 500 watts in the orbit of Mars. The energy was stored in a 20 amp-hour (Ah) nickel-cadmium battery.

=== Propulsion ===
Propulsion was provided by the RS-2101a engine, which could produce 1340 N thrust, and in total could have 5 restarts. The engine was fueled by monomethyl hydrazine and nitrogen tetroxide. For attitude control, the spacecraft contained 2 sets of 6 nitrogen jets on the tip of the solar panels. Attitude knowledge was provided by a Sun sensor, a Canopus star tracker, gyroscopes, an inertial reference unit, and an accelerometer. The thermal control was achieved by the use of louvers on the eight sides of the frame and thermal blankets.

=== Instruments and experiments ===
==== Ultraviolet Spectrometer (UVS) ====
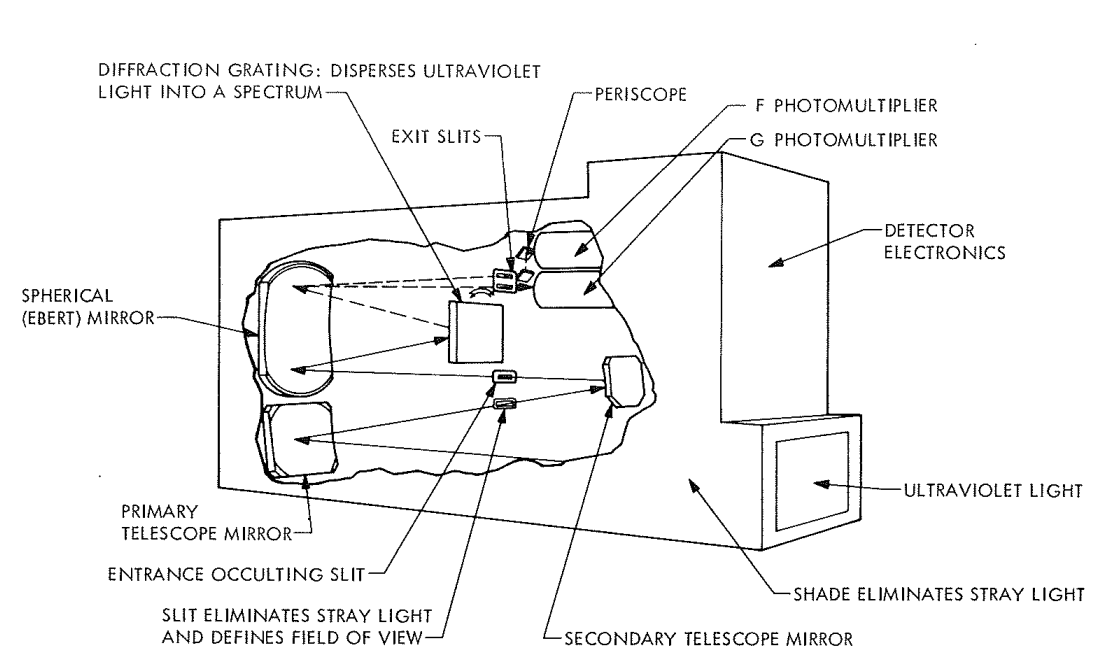
Mariner 9 Ultraviolet Spectrometer (UVS)

The Ultraviolet Spectrometer (UVS) studied the composition and density of Mars's upper atmosphere, detecting hydrogen, oxygen, and ozone. It worked on a wavelength range of 110–340 nm with a spectral resolution of 2.5 nm.

The instrument identified atomic hydrogen and oxygen in the upper atmosphere; provided data on the escape rates of these elements, influencing Mars's atmospheric evolution and mapped ozone distribution, showing seasonal variations.

The UVS was constructed by the Laboratory for Atmospheric and Space Physics at the University of Colorado, Boulder, Colorado. The ultraviolet spectrometer team was led by Professor Charles Barth.

==== Infrared Interferometer Spectrometer (IRIS) ====
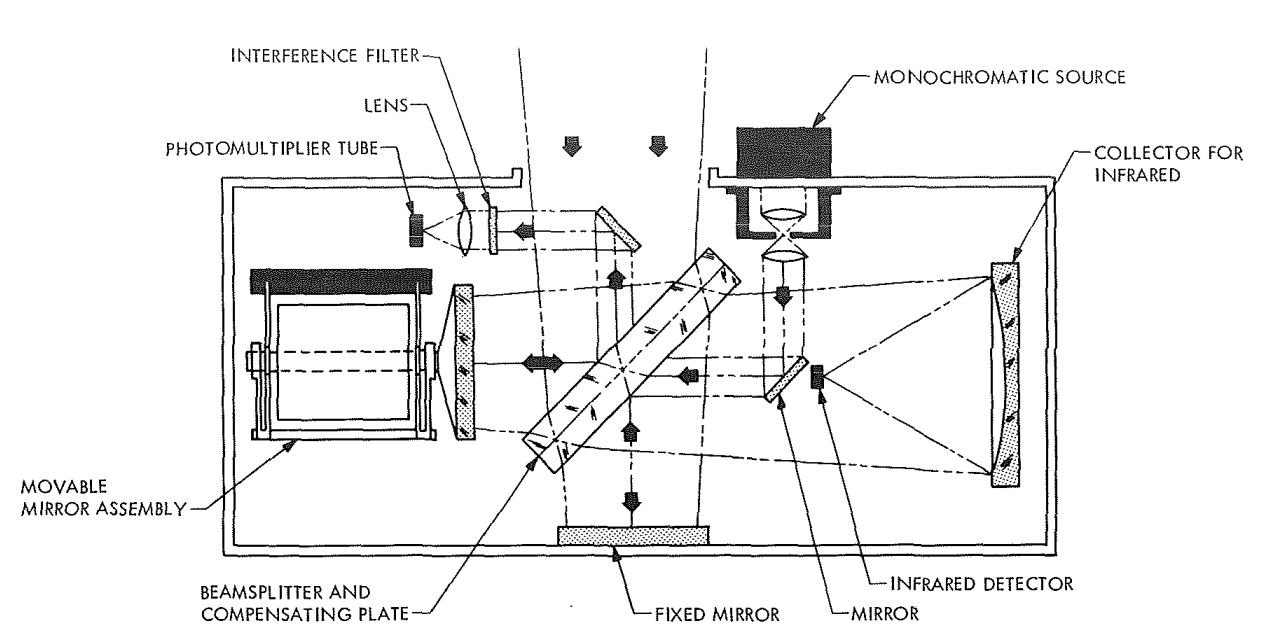
Mariner 9 Infrared Interferometer Spectrometer (IRIS)

The Infrared Interferometer Spectrometer (IRIS) measured thermal radiation emitted by Mars to analyze atmospheric composition, surface temperature, and dust properties. It worked on a wavelength range of 6–50 μm with a spectral resolution of 2.4 cm^{−1}.

The instrument confirmed the presence of CO_{2} as the dominant atmospheric gas; detected water vapor in the Martian atmosphere; measured surface and atmospheric temperatures and provided insights into dust storms' thermal properties.

The IRIS team was led by Dr. Rudolf A. Hanel from NASA Goddard Spaceflight Center (GSFC). The IRIS instrument was built by Texas Instruments, Dallas, Texas.

==== Celestial Mechanics ====
The Celestial Mechanics Experiment was not a separate instrument. It used radio tracking to determine Mars's gravitational field and refine its mass estimates. It was based on analysis of Doppler shifts in the spacecraft's radio signals and measuring range and range rate to track Mariner 9's precise motion.

The experiment improved the understanding of Mars's gravitational field, provided more accurate estimates of Mars's mass and shape and helped refine the planet's rotational parameters.

==== S-Band Occultation ====
The S-Band Occultation Experiment was not a separate instrument. It used Mariner 9's radio signal at 2.295 GHz (S-band) passing through Mars's atmosphere to study its density, pressure, and temperature profiles.

The experiment measured vertical profiles of temperature and pressure in the Martian atmosphere, detected variations in the ionosphere and confirmed the presence of CO_{2} as the main atmospheric component.

==== Infrared Radiometer (IRR) ====
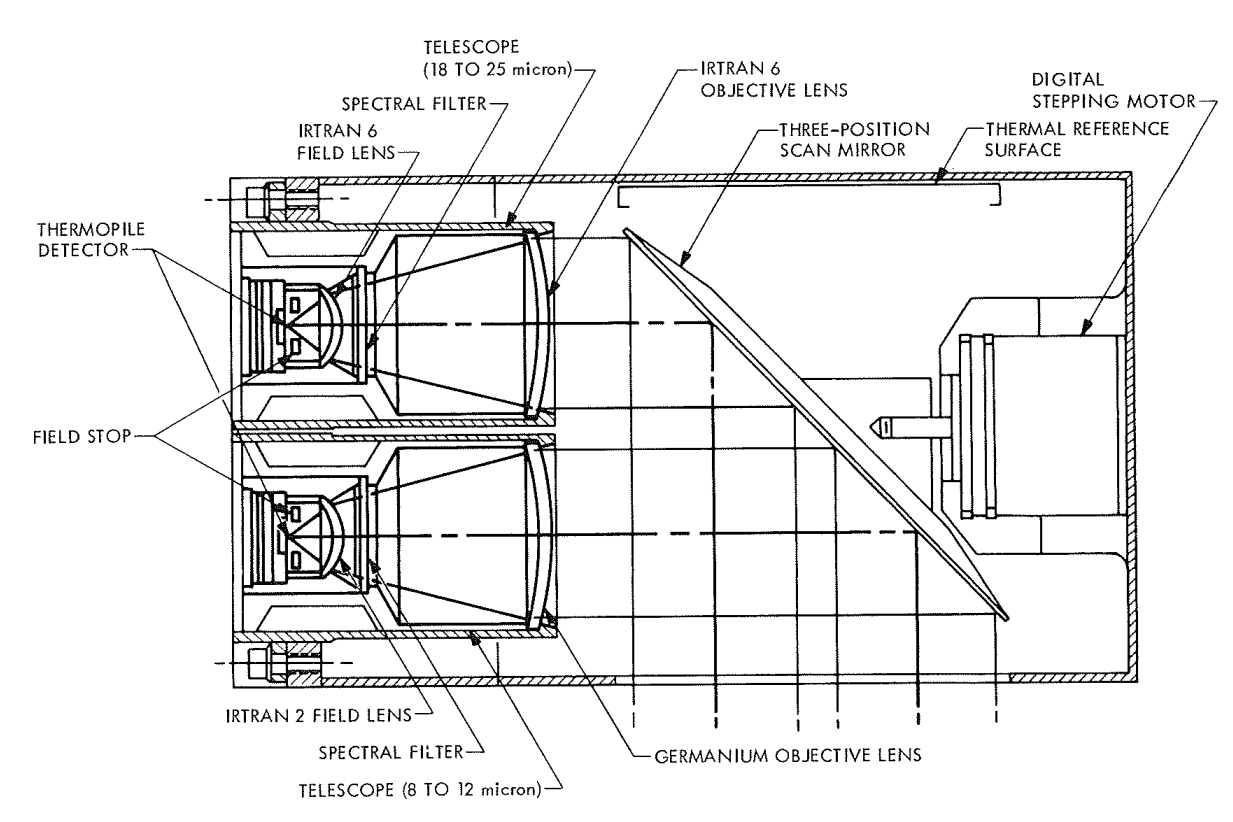
Mariner 9 Infrared Radiometer (IRR)

The Infrared Radiometer (IRR) measured surface and atmospheric temperatures using infrared radiation. It worked on a wavelength range of 10–12 μm with a field of view of 1.7° × 1.7°.

The instrument provided surface temperature maps of Mars, monitored thermal properties of dust storms and identified temperature variations between day and night cycles.

The IRR team was led by Professor Gerald Neugebauer from the California Institute of Technology (Caltech).

==== Visual Imaging System ====
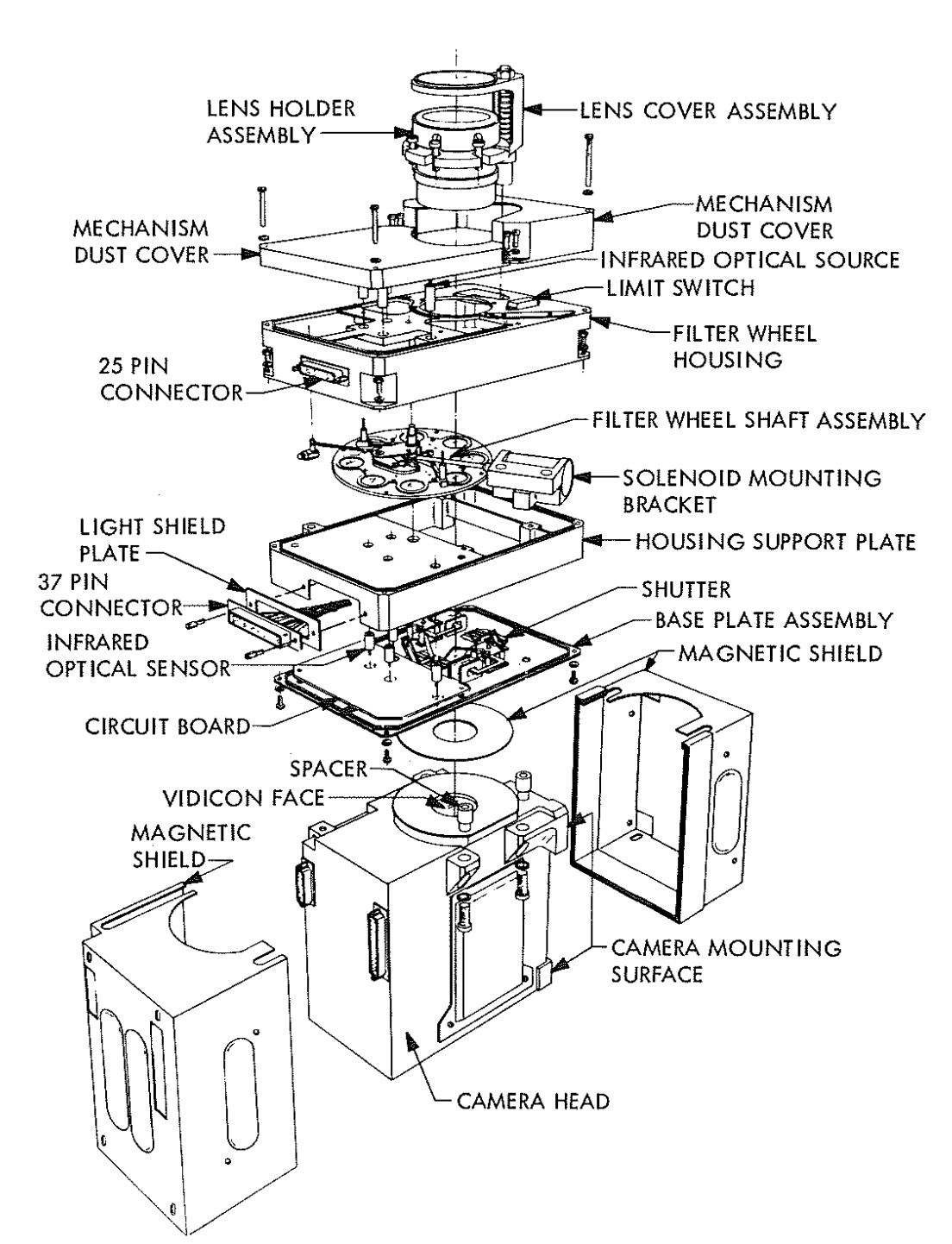
Visual Imaging System Camera A (wide-angle)

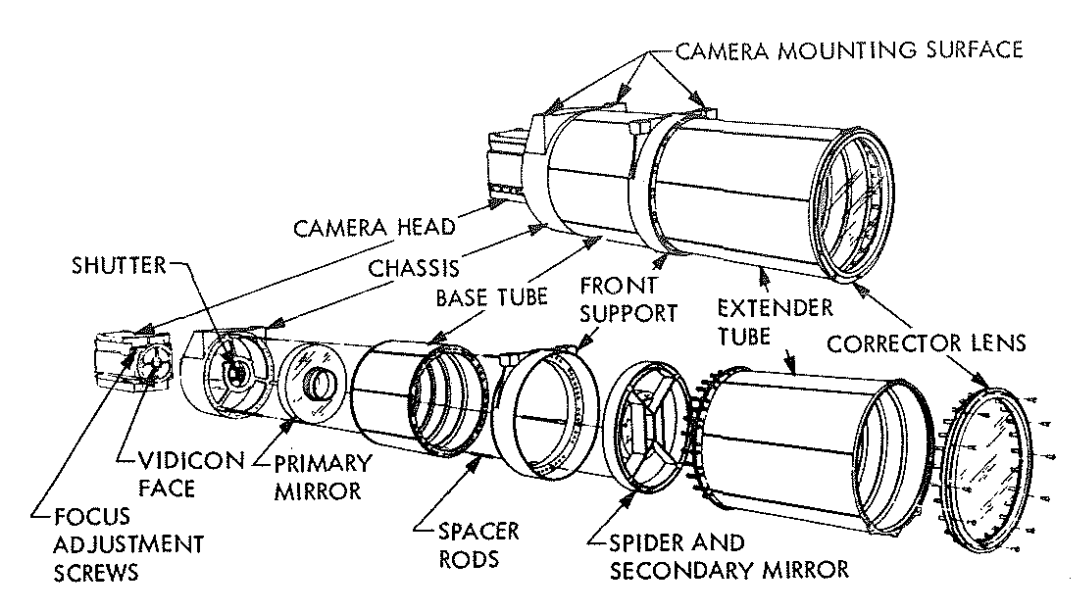
Visual Imaging System Camera B (narrow-angle)

The Visual Imaging System captured high-resolution images of Mars's surface, weather patterns, and moons. It employed two vidicon television cameras, with a resolution of 832 by 700 pixels.

In a lower orbit, half that of Mariner 6 and Mariner 7 flyby missions, and with a vastly improved imaging system, Mariner 9 achieved a resolution of 98 metres (320 ft) per pixel, whereas previous Martian probes had achieved only approximately 790 metres (2,600 ft) per pixel. It used broadband filters of various wavelengths optimized for surface and atmospheric studies.

The wide-angle Camera A produced pictures using eight selectable colored filters: Minus Blue/ Yellow, Orange, Polarized 0°, Green, Polarized 60°, Blue, Polarized 120° and Violet. From a periapsis altitude of 2000 km each image covered an area of 11° × 14°.

The narrow-angle Camera B didn't use any filters, but had a response equivalent to camera A's Minus Blue / Yellow filter. From a periapsis altitude of 2000 km each image covered an area of 1.1° × 1.4°.

The following table summarizes characteristics of both cameras:

Visual Imaging System camera filters
Camera	Filter	Peak (nm)	Bandwidth (nm)
A	1 – Minus Blue / Yellow	560	480–670
A	2 – Orange	610	570–680
A	3 – Polarized 0°	565	480–670
A	4 – Green	545	560–580
A	5 – Polarized 60°	565	480–670
A	6 – Blue	477	440–530
A	7 – Polarized 120°	565	480–670
A	8 – Violet	414	360–450
B	Minus Blue / Yellow	558	480–670

The instrument provided the first global mapping of Mars's surface; discovered volcanoes, valleys, and dried riverbeds, suggesting past water activity; captured dust storms covering the entire planet and mapped Phobos and Deimos, Mars's two moons.

== Mission ==
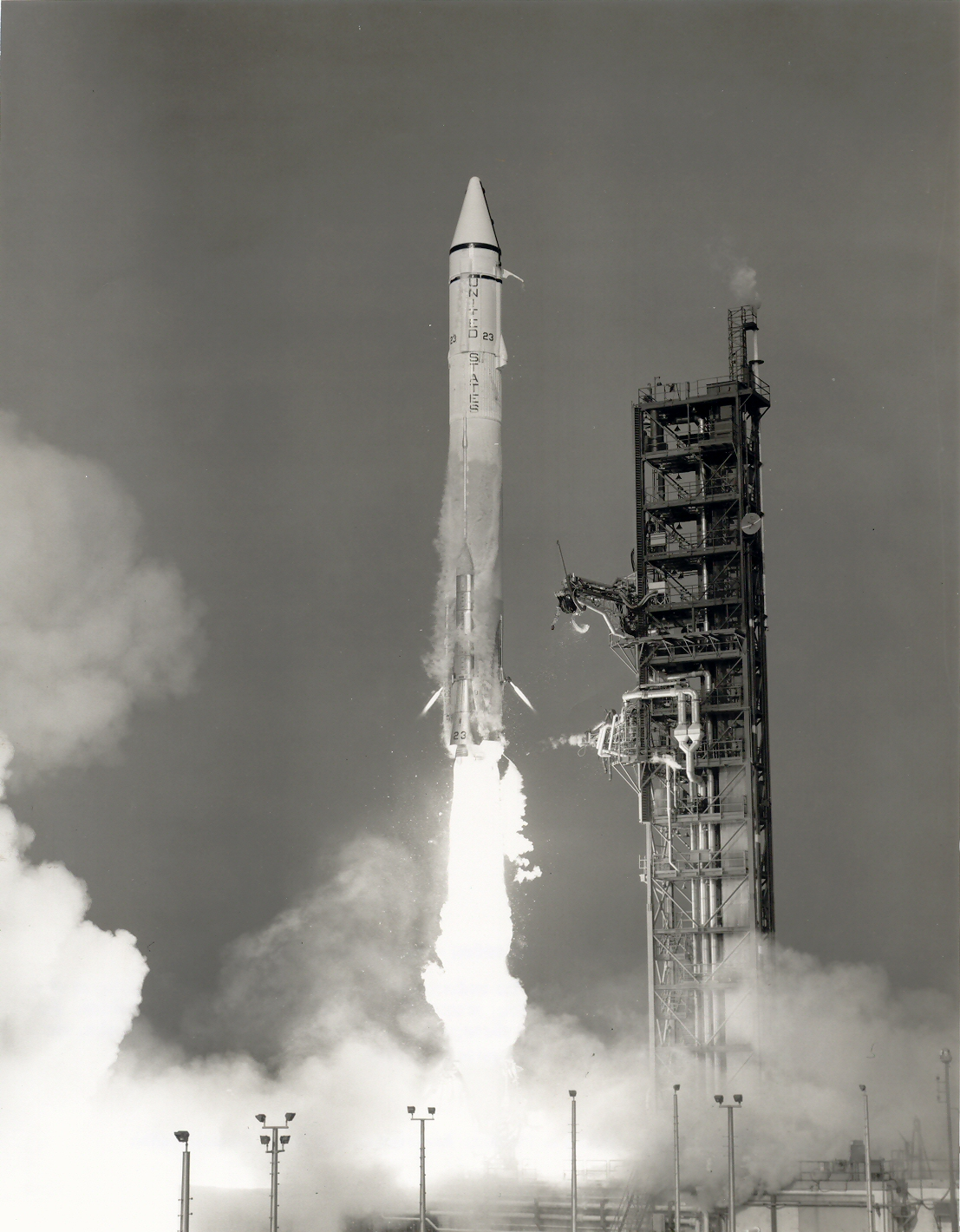
Mariner 9 launch

Mariner 9 was mated to Atlas-Centaur AC-23 on May 9 with investigation into Mariner 8's failure ongoing. The malfunction was traced to a problem in the Centaur's pitch control servo amplifier and because it was not clear if the spacecraft itself had been responsible, RFI testing was conducted on Mariner 9 to ensure the probe was not releasing interference that could cause problems with the Centaur's electronics. All testing came back negative and on May 22, a tested and verified rate gyro package arrived from Convair and was installed in the Centaur.

Liftoff took place on May 30 at 22:23:04 UT. All launch vehicle systems performed normally and the Mariner separated from the Centaur at 13 minutes and 18 seconds after launch.

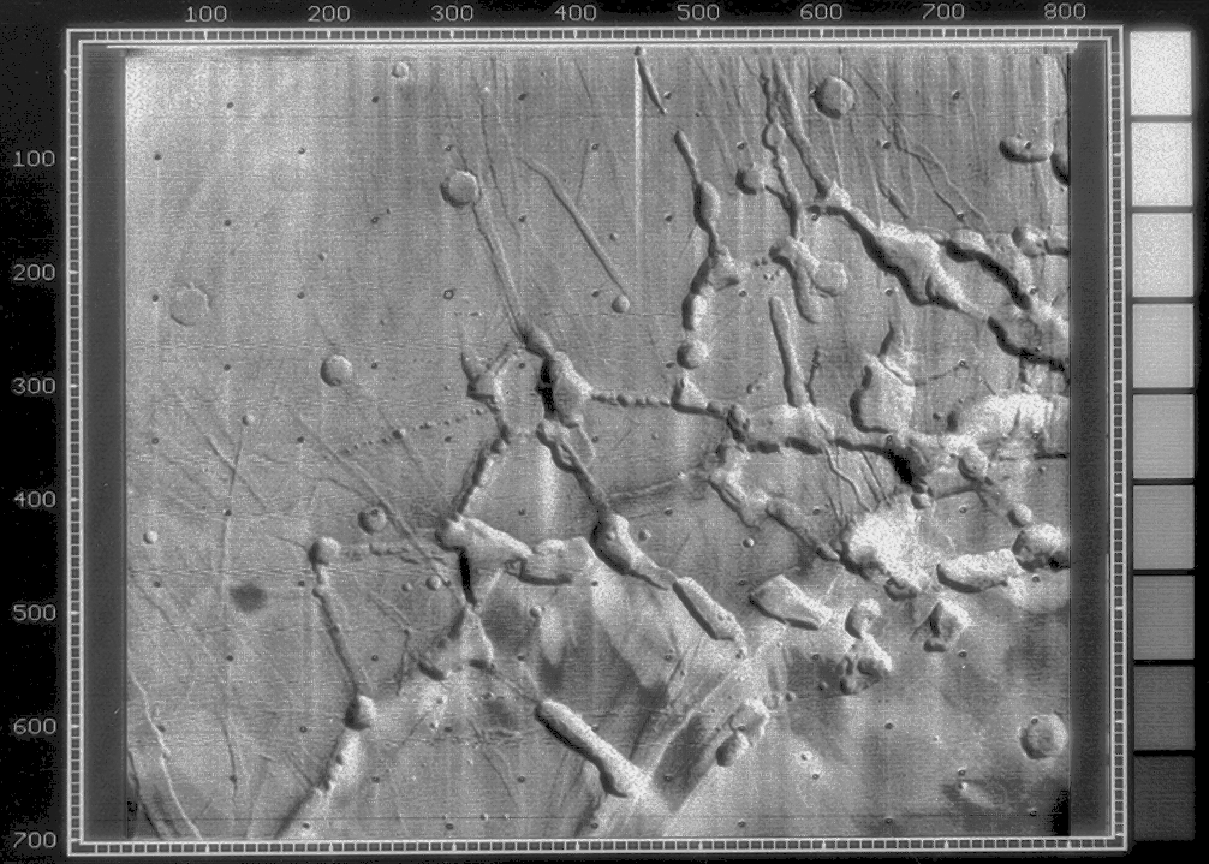
Mariner 9 view of the Noctis Labyrinthus "labyrinth" at the western end of Valles Marineris.

When Mariner 9 arrived at Mars on November 10, 1971, planetary scientists were surprised (although had anticipated during perihelic opposition) to find the atmosphere was thick with "a planet-wide robe of dust, the largest storm ever observed." The surface was totally obscured. On November 14 1971 after slowing down, Mariner 9's computer was thus reprogrammed from Earth to delay imaging of the surface for a couple of months until the dust settled, closing down the camera in order to save energy; main surface imaging did not get underway until mid-January 1972. However, surface-obscured images did contribute to the collection of Mars science, including understanding of the existence of several huge high-altitude volcanoes of the Tharsis Bulge that gradually became visible as the dust storm abated. This unexpected situation made a strong case for the desirability of studying a planet from orbit rather than merely flying past. It also highlighted the importance of flexible mission software. The Soviet Union's Mars 2 and Mars 3 probes, which arrived during the same dust storm, were unable to adapt to the unexpected conditions having been preprogrammed, which severely limited the amount of data that they were able to collect.

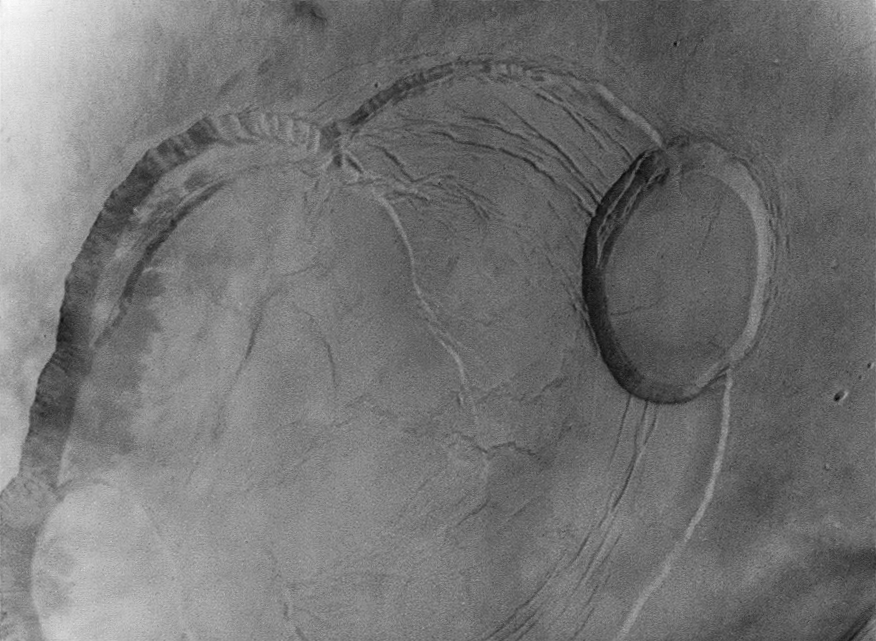
Mariner 9 narrow angle camera of Olympus Mons' central caldera. This image was among the first images to confirm that Olympus Mons was a volcano – the largest known in the Solar System.

After 349 days in orbit, Mariner 9 had transmitted 7,329 images, covering 85% of Mars's surface, whereas previous flyby missions had returned less than one thousand images covering only a small portion of the planetary surface. The images revealed river beds, craters, massive extinct volcanoes (such as Olympus Mons, the largest known volcano in the Solar System; Mariner 9 led directly to its reclassification from Nix Olympica), canyons (including the Valles Marineris, a system of canyons over about 4,020 kilometres (2,500 mi) long), evidence of wind erosion and deposition, weather fronts, fogs, and more. Mars's small moons, Phobos and Deimos, were also photographed.

The findings from the Mariner 9 mission underpinned the later Viking program.

The enormous Valles Marineris canyon system is named after Mariner 9 in honor of its achievements.

After depleting its supply of attitude control gas, the spacecraft was turned off on October 27, 1972.

== Present location ==
Mariner 9 remained in orbit around Mars after its operational use. Though the spacecraft was functional well into the mid 1970s, the attitude jets that oriented Mariner 9's solar panels toward the Sun had long since run out of gas. Usable gas remained aboard inside the fuel tanks of the main engine, but there was no way to transfer it for attitude control. Such a modification had been possible, but it would have cost an additional $30,000 to implement. This was a comparative pittance compared to the mission's $100 million total cost, but it was nevertheless rejected for budgetary reasons.

NASA had provided multiple dates for when Mariner 9 could enter the Martian atmosphere. At the time of the mission, Mariner 9 was left in an orbit that would not decay for at least 50 years. In 2011, NASA predicted that Mariner 9 would burn up or crash into Mars around 2022. However, a 2018 revision to the Mariner 9 mission page by NASA expected Mariner 9 would crash into Mars "sometime around 2020". Today it is thought Mariner 9 either burnt up on entry of the Martian atmosphere or impacted the surface, though there is no definitive proof.

== Error-correction codes ==
Matrix of the Hadamard code (32, 6, 16) for the Reed-Muller Code (1, 5) of the NASA space probe Mariner 9

To control for errors in the reception of the grayscale image data sent by Mariner 9 (caused by a low signal-to-noise ratio), the data had to be encoded before transmission using a so-called forward error-correcting code (FEC). Without FEC, noise would have made up roughly a quarter of a received image, while the FEC encoded the data in a redundant way which allowed for the reconstruction of most of the sent image data at reception.

Since the flown hardware was constrained with regards to weight, power consumption, storage, and computing power, some considerations had to be put into choosing an FEC, and it was decided to use a Hadamard code for Mariner 9. Each image pixel was represented as a six-bit binary value, which had 64 possible grayscale levels. Because of limitations of the transmitter, the maximum useful data length was about 30 bits. Instead of using a repetition code, a [32, 6, 16] Hadamard code was used, which is also a 1st-order Reed-Muller code. Errors of up to seven bits per each 32-bit word could be corrected using this scheme. Compared to a five-repetition code, the error correcting properties of this Hadamard code were much better, yet its data rate was comparable. The efficient decoding algorithm was an important factor in the decision to use this code. The circuitry used was called the "Green Machine", which employed the fast Fourier transform, increasing the decoding speed by a factor of three.

== See also ==
- Exploration of Mars
- List of Mars orbiters
- List of missions to Mars
- Space exploration
- Timeline of artificial satellites and space probes
- Uncrewed space missions
- Mars flyby
