= Long code (mathematics) =

Computational theory

Math logic

Classification
- Type: Block code
- Block length: $2^{n}$ for some $n\in\N$
- Message length: $\log n$
- Alphabet size: $2$
- Notation: $(2^{n},\log n)_2$-code

In theoretical computer science and coding theory, the long code is an error-correcting code that is locally decodable. Long codes have an extremely poor rate, but play a fundamental role in the theory of hardness of approximation.

== Definition ==
Let $f_1,\dots,f_{2^n} : \{0,1\}^k\to \{0,1\}$ for $k=\log n$ be the list of all functions from $\{0,1\}^k\to\{0,1\}$. Then the long code encoding of a message $x\in\{0,1\}^k$ is the string $f_1(x)\circ f_2(x)\circ\dots\circ f_{2^n}(x)$ where $\circ$ denotes concatenation of strings. This string has length $2^n=2^{2^k}$.

The Walsh-Hadamard code is a subcode of the long code, and can be obtained by only using functions $f_i$ that are linear functions when interpreted as functions $\mathbb F_2^k\to\mathbb F_2$ on the finite field with two elements. Since there are only $2^k$ such functions, the block length of the Walsh-Hadamard code is $2^k$.

An equivalent definition of the long code is as follows: The Long code encoding of $j\in[n]$ is defined to be the truth table of the Boolean dictatorship function on the $j$th coordinate, i.e., the truth table of $f:\{0,1\}^n\to\{0,1\}$ with $f(x_1,\dots,x_n)=x_j$. Thus, the Long code encodes a $(\log n)$-bit string as a $2^n$-bit string.

== Properties ==
The long code does not contain repetitions, in the sense that the function $f_i$ computing the $i$th bit of the output is different from any function $f_j$ computing the $j$th bit of the output for $j\neq i$. Among all codes that do not contain repetitions, the long code has the longest possible output. Moreover, it contains all non-repeating codes as a subcode.
