= Repetition code =

Simple but inefficient error-correcting code

In coding theory, the repetition code is one of the most basic linear error-correcting codes. In order to transmit a message over a noisy channel that may corrupt the transmission in a few places, the idea of the repetition code is to just repeat the message several times. The hope is that the channel corrupts only a minority of these repetitions. This way, the receiver will notice that a transmission error occurred since the received data stream is not the repetition of a single message, and moreover, the receiver can recover the original message by looking at the received message in the data stream that occurs most often.

Because of the bad error correcting performance coupled with the low code rate (ratio between useful information symbols and actual transmitted symbols), other error correction codes are preferred in most cases. The chief attraction of the repetition code is the ease of implementation.

== Code parameters ==
In the case of a binary repetition code, there exist two code words - all ones and all zeros - which have a length of $n$. Therefore, the minimum Hamming distance of the code equals its length $n$. This gives the repetition code an error correcting capacity of $\tfrac{n-1}{2}$ (i.e. it will correct up to $\tfrac{n-1}{2}$ errors in any code word).

If the length of a binary repetition code is odd, then it's a perfect code. The binary repetition code of length n is equivalent to the (n, 1)-Hamming code. A (n, 1) BCH code is also a repetition code.

== Example ==
Consider a binary repetition code of length 3. The user wants to transmit the information bits 101. Then the encoding maps each bit either to the all ones or all zeros code word, so we get the 111 000 111, which will be transmitted.

Let's say three errors corrupt the transmitted bits and the received sequence is 111 010 100. Decoding is usually done by a simple majority decision for each code word. That leads us to 100 as the decoded information bits, because in the first and second code word occurred less than two errors, so the majority of the bits are correct. But in the third code word two bits are corrupted, which results in an erroneous information bit, since two errors lie above the error correcting capacity.

== Applications ==
Despite their poor performance as stand-alone codes, use in Turbo code-like iteratively decoded concatenated coding schemes, such as repeat-accumulate (RA) and accumulate-repeat-accumulate (ARA) codes, allows for surprisingly good error correction performance.

Repetition codes are one of the few known codes whose code rate can be automatically adjusted to varying channel capacity, by sending more or less parity information as required to overcome the channel noise, and it is the only such code known for non-erasure channels. Practical adaptive codes for erasure channels have been invented only recently, and are known as fountain codes.

Some UARTs, such as the ones used in the FlexRay protocol, use a majority filter to ignore brief noise spikes. This spike-rejection filter can be seen as a kind of repetition decoder.

== See also ==
- Block code
- Turbo code
