= Preparata code =

In coding theory, the Preparata codes form a class of non-linear double-error-correcting codes. They are named after Franco P. Preparata who first described them in 1968.

Although non-linear over GF(2) the Preparata codes are linear over Z_{4} with the Lee distance.

== Construction ==
Let m be an odd number, and $n = 2^m-1$. We first describe the extended Preparata code of length $2n+2 = 2^{m+1}$: the Preparata code is then derived by deleting one position. The words of the extended code are regarded as pairs (X, Y) of 2^{m}-tuples, each corresponding to subsets of the finite field GF(2^{m}) in some fixed way.

The extended code contains the words (X, Y) satisfying three conditions

1. X, Y each have even weight;
2. $\sum_{x \in X} x = \sum_{y \in Y} y;$
3. $\sum_{x \in X} x^3 + \left(\sum_{x \in X} x\right)^3 = \sum_{y \in Y} y^3.$

The Preparata code is obtained by deleting the position in X corresponding to 0 in GF(2^{m}).

== Properties ==
The Preparata code is of length 2^{m+1} − 1, size 2^{k} where k = 2^{m + 1} − 2m − 2, and minimum distance 5.

When m = 3, the Preparata code of length 15 is also called the Nordstrom–Robinson code.
