= Golay code =

Golay code may refer to:

- Binary Golay code, an error-correcting code used in digital communications
- Ternary Golay code
- (Golay) complementary sequences
