= Lee distance =

In coding theory, the Lee distance is a distance between two strings $x_1 x_2 \dots x_n$ and $y_1 y_2 \dots y_n$ of equal length n over the q-ary alphabet {0, 1, …, q − 1} of size q ≥ 2. It is a metric defined as
$$\sum_{i=1}^n \min(|x_i - y_i|,\, q - |x_i - y_i|).$$
If q = 2 or q = 3 the Lee distance coincides with the Hamming distance, because both distances are 0 for two single equal symbols and 1 for two single non-equal symbols. For q > 3 this is not the case anymore; the Lee distance between single letters can become greater than 1. However, there exists a Gray isometry (weight-preserving bijection) between $\mathbb{Z}_4$ with the Lee weight and $\mathbb{Z}_2^2$ with the Hamming weight.

Considering the alphabet as the additive group Z_{q}, the Lee distance between two single letters $x$ and $y$ is the length of shortest path in the Cayley graph (which is circular since the group is cyclic) between them. More generally, the Lee distance between two strings of length n is the length of the shortest path between them in the Cayley graph of $\mathbf{Z}_q^n$. This can also be thought of as the quotient metric resulting from reducing Z^{n} with the Manhattan distance modulo the lattice qZ^{n}. The analogous quotient metric on a quotient of Z^{n} modulo an arbitrary lattice is known as a Mannheim metric or Mannheim distance.

The metric space induced by the Lee distance is a discrete analog of the elliptic space.

== Example ==
If q = 6, then the Lee distance between 3140 and 2543 is 1 + 2 + 0 + 3 = 6.

== History and application ==
The Lee distance is named after William Chi Yuan Lee (李始元). It is applied for phase modulation while the Hamming distance is used in case of orthogonal modulation.

The Berlekamp code is an example of code in the Lee metric. Other significant examples are the Preparata code and Kerdock code; these codes are non-linear when considered over a field, but are linear over a ring.
