= Slepian =

Slepian is a surname. Notable people with the surname include:

- Barnett Slepian (1946–1998), American physician and OB/GYN who was shot and killed in his home by an anti-abortion activist, James Charles Kopp
- Dan Slepian, American journalist, author, podcaster, and senior investigative producer at Dateline NBC.
- David Slepian (1923–2007), American mathematician
- Jan Slepian (1921–2016), author of books for children and young adults
- Joseph Slepian (1891–1969), American electrical engineer known for his contributions to the developments of electrical apparatus and theory
- Vladimir Slepian, a.k.a. Eric Pid (1930–1998), French artist and writer of Russian-Jewish origin

== See also ==
- Slepian's lemma, in probability theory, named after David Slepian
- Slepian function, in signal processing, named after David Slepian
