= La Boudeuse (painting) =

Painting by Antoine Watteau

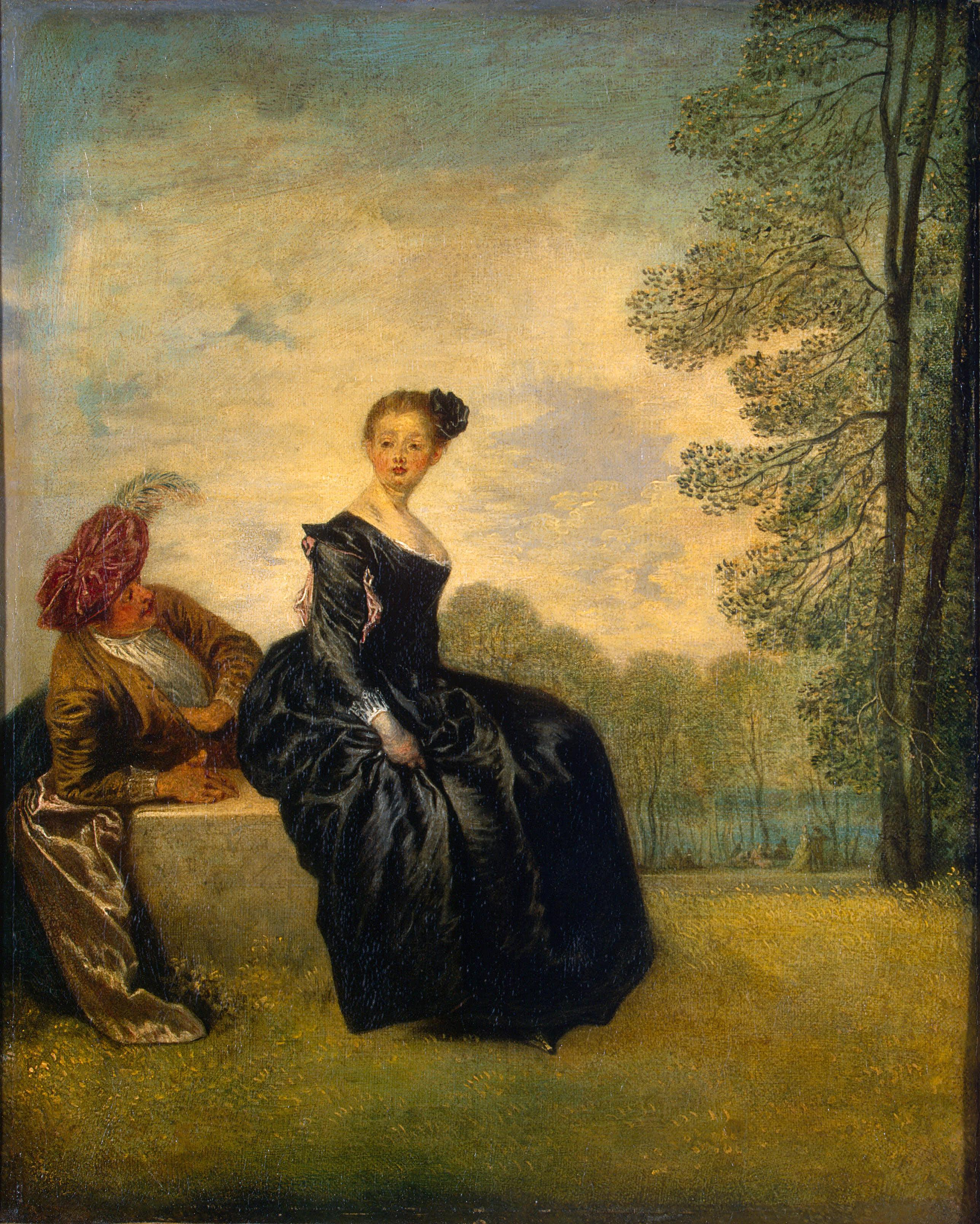
- Artist: Antoine Watteau
- Year: Between 1715 and 1718; See § Dating
- Catalogue: G 114; DV 303; R 101; HA 220; EC 116; F B24; RM 163; RT 44
- Medium: oil on canvas
- Dimensions: 42 cm × 34 cm (17 in × 13 in)
- Location: Hermitage Museum; Saint Petersburg
- Accession: ГЭ-4120

La Boudeuse is the modern title (Note: As common case within Watteau's body of work, the painting has no author title, and so has not Philippe Mercier's etching. The traditional French title, La Boudeuse, was first applied to Mercier's etching in Gilbert Paignon-Dijonval's collection inventory, compiled by Pieri Benard in 1810; however, this name was not used in 19th-century sources in relation to either the painting or the etching, until it came into general use following the publication of Edmond de Goncourt's 1875 catalogue raisonné. The contemporary Russian title, Капризница, came into use as far as the 1930s; it has been claimed but never proven to be an 18th-century Russian translation of the original French term. In English sources, the painting has been variously referred to as The Pouting Girl, The Sulking Woman, The Capricious Girl, The Capricious Woman, and Woman Sulking.) given to an oil on canvas painting in the Hermitage Museum, Saint Petersburg, by the French Rococo painter Antoine Watteau (1684–1721). Completed in the late 1710s, La Boudeuse depicts a young couple set amidst a park in the foreground, in a rare example of the two-figure landscape composition which is considered one of the best fêtes galantes in Watteau's later work. However, the picture's authenticity was also a subject of scholarly debate, for it had been engraved by English painter Philippe Mercier, once a follower of Watteau, and was not included in Jean de Jullienne's edition of Watteau's work published in the 1730s.

Since the mid-18th century, La Boudeuse was among collections formed by the British statesman Robert Walpole, and later by his son, the writer Horace Walpole; until the sale of 1842, it was located in Horace Walpole's estate, Strawberry Hill House. Following a number of sales in the middle of the 19th century, the painting came into possession of prominent Russian art collector, Count Pavel Stroganov; after the Revolution of 1917, La Boudeuse was transferred into the Hermitage Museum, where it remains.

== Provenance ==
The painting's known provenance, researched since the 1960s in the West and Russia respectively, (Note: The relation of La Boudeuse to the Walpoles' collections in England was discovered by Soviet art historian Vladimir Levinson-Lessing. In the West, an extensive account on the painting's provenance was given in American scholar Martin Eidelberg's 1969 article published in The Burlington Magazine. Further research on the painting's history within the Stroganov family collection was undertaken in the 1990s and 2000s.) establishes that after Watteau's death, La Boudeuse was already in England, owned by London-based dealer Salomon Gautier, a close acquaintance of Roger de Piles; in the 1726 sale catalogue of Gautier's collection, La Boudeuse appears to be the painting under lot 34 described as "a Man and a Woman sitting, Watteau." Some time later, after 1736, La Boudeuse came into possession of Sir Robert Walpole, the first British Prime Minister; as part of the Walpole collection, the painting probably hung either in the home of the Prime Minister at 10 Downing Street or in the Walpoles' country estate at Houghton Hall. Upon Robert Walpole's death in 1745, his collections, except those at Houghton Hall, were put on a sale in London in 1748; La Boudeuse was lot 52 on day two of the sale, when it was bought back by Sir Robert Walpole's son, the writer Horace Walpole, who paid three pounds, three shillings. La Boudeuse soon entered the holdings of Horace' estate, Strawberry Hill House. In Strawberry Hill House, the painting was present in the Tribune (also called the Cabinet), notably depicted in watercolours by John Carter and Edward Edwards; it has also been mentioned in Walpole's A Description of the Villa, having the same description as in the 1726 sale catalogue.

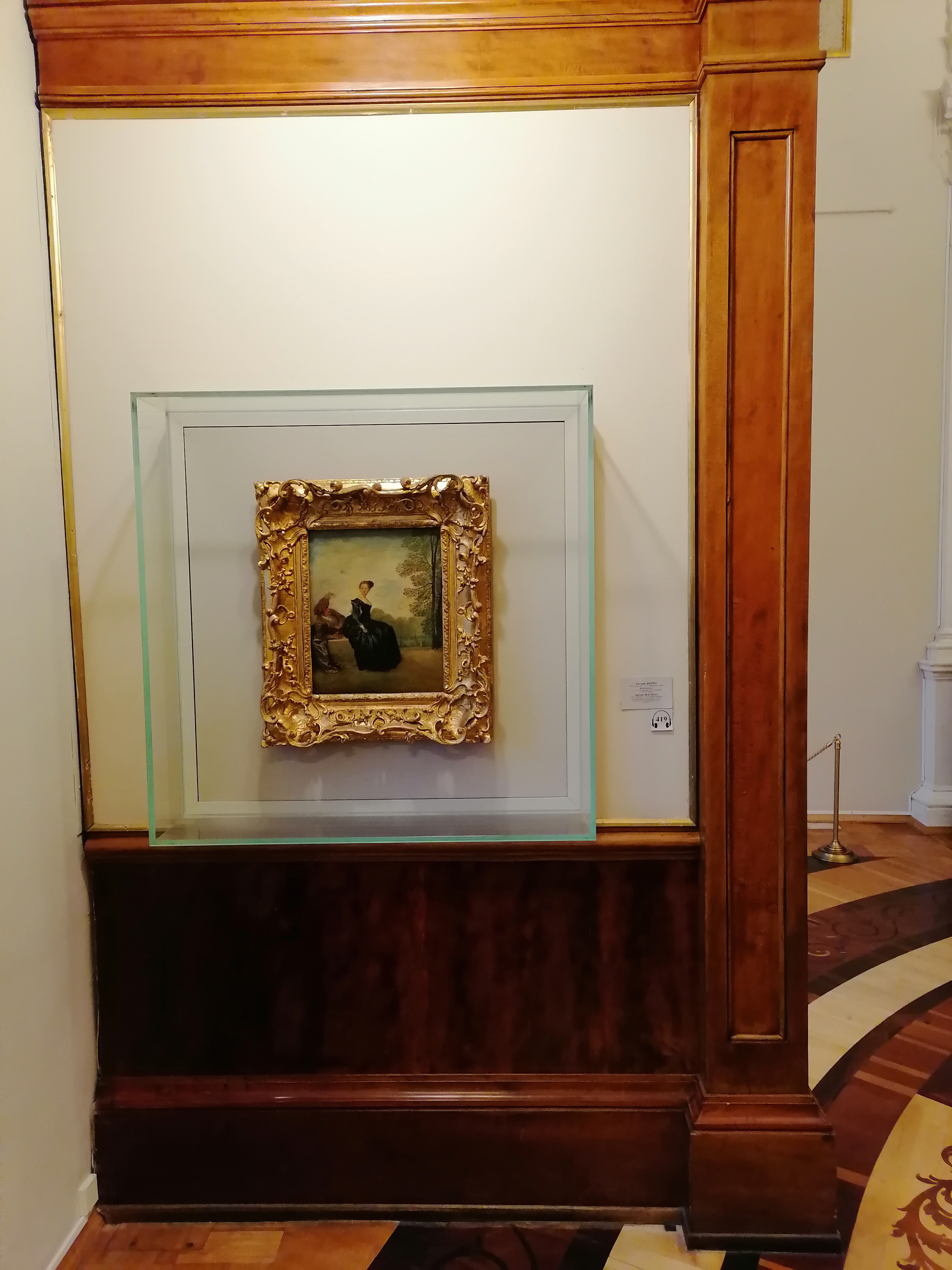
La Boudeuse as it appears in Room 284 of the Hermitage contemporary exhibition, the former second room of military pictures of the Winter Palace

La Boudeuse formed part of the Strawberry Hill collection until 1842, when it has been dispersed in the month-long "Great Sale"; on the 13th day of the sale, a certain Emery, who lived in London at 5 Bury Street, bought La Boudeuse for thirty nine guineas. Not long after, it came into possession of Charles de Morny, the half-brother of the future Emperor Napoleon III. After a decade in the comte de Morny's collection, the painting — now known as La Conversation — was sold at auction for 1,700 francs on 24 May 1852 to the certain Henri Didier, who, in turn, didn't kept the picture for long; it then passed to Charles de Ferrol, a Parisian dealer who similarly had the painting for a brief time and sold it at auction for 2,600 francs on 22 January 1856.

Some time after Ferrol's sale, La Boudeuse belonged to the comte de Morny's agent Jean-Jacques Meffre (1804–1865), from whom it has been bought for 5,000 francs in 1859 by Russian Count Pavel Stroganov; along with other items, La Boudeuse was first presented to the Russian public on an exhibition organised by Stroganov in 1861 at the Imperial Academy of Arts, Saint Petersburg. As part of Stroganov's collection, La Boudeuse — described as Scéne champêtre in the collection inventory compiled by Meffre and Gustav Friedrich Waagen — was placed in his mansion in Saint Petersburg at Sergievskaya Street, present in the Green Drawing Room, a reception room at the mansion's upper floor where the collection's most notable items were also held; in an 1875 essay on Stroganov's mansion, the writer Dmitry Grigorovich — a close friend and advisor of Stroganov — refers to La Boudeuse as "a declaration of love in the garden." La Boudeuse was the sole Watteau painting in Pavel Stroganov's collection, and so was in the larger Stroganov family collection.

In his will, Stroganov wished to pass La Boudeuse, among other pieces, to his younger brother Grigory, but the latter died in 1910, before the will could be properly executed; after Pavel Stroganov's death in 1911, his collection at Sergievskaya Street was succeeded by a grandnephew, Prince Georgy Shcherbatov (1896–1976). Some time later, possibly during 1917, it was relocated into the Stroganovs' main residence, the Stroganov Palace at the intersection of the Moika River and Nevsky Prospect. Following the revolution that year, the Stroganov collections were nationalised; the Stroganov Palace was reformed into a state museum, with La Boudeuse forming its part. Following theft attempts in Winter 1919–1920, a number of paintings, including La Boudeuse, have been transferred into the Hermitage Museum out of security concerns. Initially a temporary decision, the transfer turned out to be a permanent one, following the shutdown of the Stroganov Palace as museum in the late 1920s. Since then, La Boudeuse forms part of the Hermitage Museum permanent exhibition; it is on view in Room 284, formerly the second room of military pictures in the Winter Palace.

=== Dating ===
In the 1912 album and catalogue, the German historian Ernst Heinrich Zimmermann attributed La Boudeuse to ca. 1716–1718, placing it in relation to two versions of The Embarkation for Cythera. In the 1950s, Jacques Mathey has dated it c. 1715, placing to the same year with The Embarrassing Proposal. Nemilova dated the painting ca. 1718 on stylistic grounds; given its provenance within the Walpoles' collections, Nemilova and other, notably Russian, critics speculated that Watteau might have painted it some time before or during his English trip, usually dated ca. 1719–1720; on that ground, Yuri Zolotov preferred a c. 1720 dating. In a 1968 catalogue raisonné, Ettore Camesasca places La Boudeuse to c. 1715, while not accepting Watteau's authorship; later in 1980, Marianne Roland Michel attributed it to ca. 1715–1716. Rosenberg has attributed the painting to c. 1717, yet found Nemilova's dating quite convincing. Later authors, such as Renaud Temperini and Guillaume Glorieux, attribute the painting to ca. 1715–1717 and c. 1715, respectively.

== Related works ==
=== Watteau's paintings and drawing ===
There are two surviving works by Watteau which have been compared to La Boudeuse, The Feast of Love, now in the Alte Meister Gallery, Dresden, and The Pleasures of the Ball, now in the Dulwich Gallery, London. In The Feast of Love, a male figure appears to fully repeat that found on the Hermitage painting, save for his clothes' colour; there is also a similar character in Entretiens amoureux, a presumably lost painting known through a print by Jean-Michel Liotard, the twin brother to renowned pastelist Jean-Étienne Liotard. In The Pleasures of the Ball, a woman is shown wearing a black gown with the long slashed slevees.

The only one drawing by Watteau that has been associated with La Boudeuse is a red chalk study of the man's head wearing a beret (PM 749; RP 332), dated c. 1715, and now located in the Louvre. In Parker and Mathey's catalogue, the drawing was considered to be a preliminary study for both La Boudeuse and The Feast of Love, but Nemilova dismissed that opinion, saying that the Louvre drawing is not related with the Hermitage painting in any way; similarly, National Gallery of Art curator Margaret Grasselli questioned if the drawing could be related to the Dresden painting. Rosenberg, who did not consider the drawing to be "a true preparatory study in the strict sense of the term", only related the drawing with The Feast of Love; in a 1996 catalogue raisonné, he and Louis-Antoine Prat also concluded the drawing to be barely related to the painting, given the sitter's youthful appearance, different from that on the painting. In A Watteau Abecedario, Eidelberg stated that the sheet was trimmed on at least three sides, and presumed that the drawing was part of a larger study which could contain other studies from the same model, so the differences between the present drawing and the painted figure — the beret and feather are at a slightly different angle in the painting, and less of the left cheek is visible — can be explained.

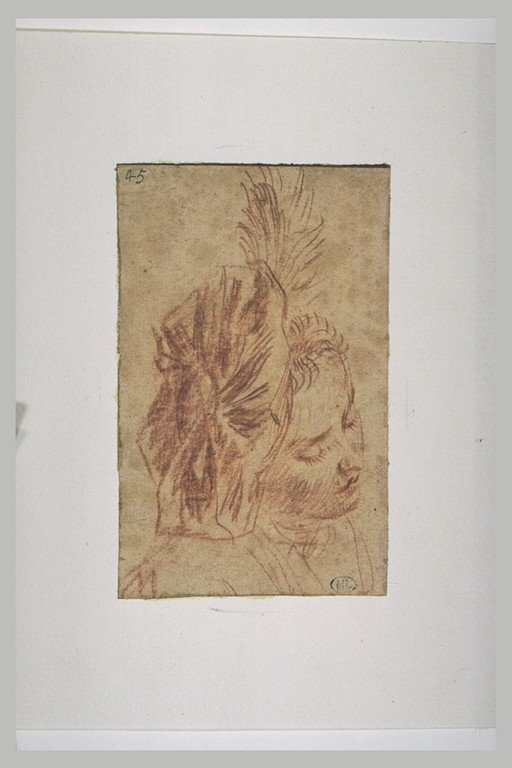
Watteau, Study of a Man's Head, c. 1715, red chalk on paper, Louvre, Paris

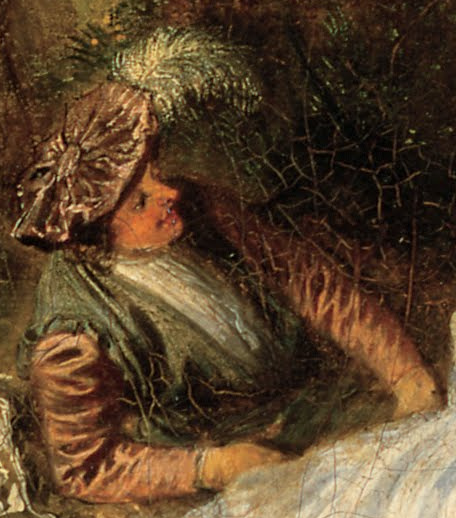
Watteau, detail of The Feast of Love, c. 1716–1718, oil on canvas, Alte Meister Gallery, Dresden

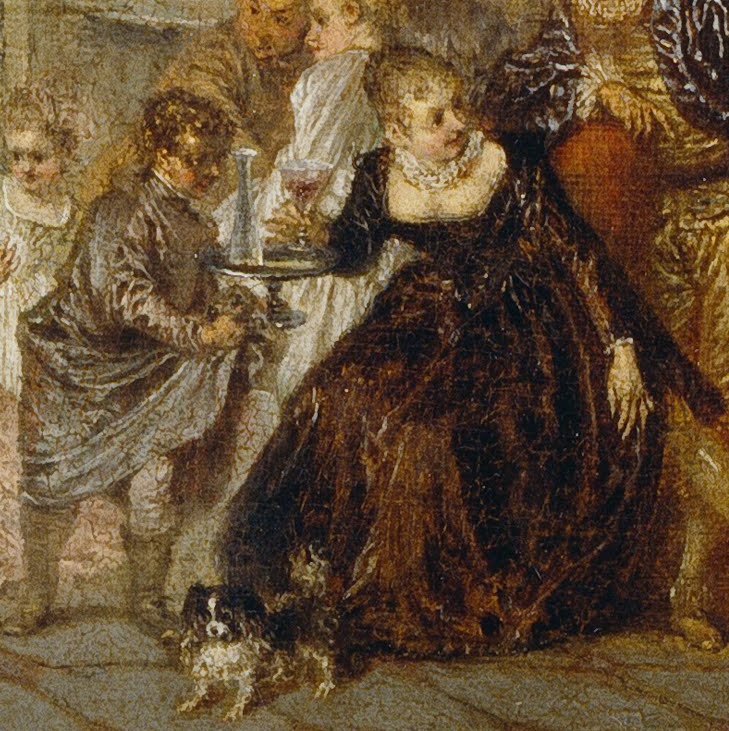
Watteau, detail of The Pleasures of the Ball, c. 1716–1718, oil on canvas, Dulwich Gallery, London

Jean-Michel Liotard after Watteau, detail of Entretiens amoureux, 1731, etching, Musée d'Art et d'Histoire, Geneva

=== Philippe Mercier's print and attribution debate ===
La Boudeuse was etched by English painter Philippe Mercier c. 1725. Pierre-Jean Mariette, who knew the print, gives a mention of it in his manuscripts: "Une femme assise dans un jardin ayant derrière elle, un homme qui lui parle, gravé par Pierre [sic] de Mercier." Like others etchings by Mercier after Watteau, La Boudeuse was not featured in the Recueil Jullienne, — though some authors claimed the contrary — possibly out of commercial reasons.

Mercier, whose early art has been influenced by that of Watteau following their acquaintance in the late 1710s, produced his own fêtes galantes based on Watteau's inventions. In the four-volume study of prints after Watteau's paintings published by Émile Dacier and Albert Vuaflart in the 1920s, it has been discovered that some etchings by Mercier, published as they were after Watteau, has actually been produced after Mercier's own inventions. Following this discovery, La Boudeuse, which authenticity was not previously questioned mostly due to its obscurity, was attributed to Mercier by Vuaflart and Jacques Herold, who claimed that Mercier copied figures from another composition by Watteau, Les Agrémens de l'esté.

Vuaflart and Herold's attribution, as well as poor quality of reproductions in Zimmermann's 1912 album, caused a scholarly debate, with some of Watteau scholars — including Robert Rey, Hélène Adhémar, and Ettore Camesasca — having adopted it, while the most of them — including Gilbert W. Barker, Hans Vollmer, Charles Sterling, Jacques Mathey, and Inna Nemilova. — stayed at the traditional attribution. Though Eidelberg's analysis of the painting, along with tracing its provenance, also confirmed Watteau's authorship on stylistic grounds, there were some reservations, notably from Jean Ferré, Robert Raines, and Donald Posner who proposed the painting to be a collaboration of Watteau and Mercier at best, with the latter responsible for the figures.

== Exhibition history ==
List of exhibitions featuring the work
| Year | Title | Location | Cat. no. |
|---|---|---|---|
| 1861 | Выставка картин и редких произведений художества, принадлежащих членам императорской фамилии и частным лицам | Imperial Academy of Arts, Saint Petersburg | 119 |
| 1922–1925 | Temporary exhibition of new acquisition from French painting of the 17th and 18th centuries | Hermitage Museum, Petrograd (later Leningrad) | * |
| 1955 | An Exhibition of French Art of the 15th-20th Centuries | Pushkin Museum, Moscow | * |
| 1956 | An Exhibition of French Art of the 12th-20th Centuries | Hermitage Museum, Leningrad | * |
| 1964 | La femme et l'artiste | Musée des Beaux-Arts de Bordeaux, Bordeaux | 98 |
| 1969 | French Art from the Hermitage | Museum of Fine Arts, Budapest | 25 |
| 1972 | Watteau and His Time | Hermitage Museum, Leningrad | 8 |
| 1972 | Meisterwerke aus der Ermitage Leningrad und aus dem Puschkin-Museum, Moskau | Albertinum, Dresden | 48 |
| 1979 | Old Master Paintings from the USSR | National Gallery of Victoria, Melbourne; Art Gallery of New South Wales, Sydney | 39 |
| 1984 | Антуан Ватто. 300 лет со дня рождения | Hermitage Museum, Leningrad | * |
| 1984–1985 | Watteau 1684–1721 | National Gallery of Art, Washington, D.C.; Galeries nationales du Grand Palais, Paris; Charlottenburg Palace, Berlin | P. 46 |
| 1988 | French Paintings from the USSR | National Gallery, London | 1 |
| 2000 | Stroganoff: The Palace and Collections of a Russian Noble Family | Portland Art Museum, Portland, Oregon; Kimbell Art Museum, Fort Worth, Texas | 133 |
| 2003–2004 | The Stroganoffs: Patrons and Collectors | Hermitage Museum, Saint Petersburg | 153 |
| 2004 | Watteau et la fête galante | Musée des Beaux-Arts de Valenciennes, Valenciennes | 43 |
| 2006–2007 | The Triumph of Eros: Art and Seduction in 18th-Century France | Hermitage Rooms, Somerset House, London | 88 |
| 2010 | Horace Walpole's Strawberry Hill | Yale Center for British Art, New Haven, Connecticut | 192 |
| 2013 | Antoine Watteau (1684-1721): La leçon de musique | Centre for Fine Arts, Brussels | 9 |
| 2019 | A Forgotten Russian Patron: The Collection of Count Pavel Sergeevich Stroganov | Hermitage Museum, Saint Petersburg | 68 |
General references: Grasselli, Rosenberg & Parmantier 1984, p. 355, Nemilova 1985b, p. 456, Eidelberg 2016. "*" denotes an unnumbered entry.

== Bibliography ==
- Adhémar, Hélène (1950). Watteau; sa vie, son oeuvre (in French). Paris: P. Tisné. pp. 48, 233; cat. no. 220. OCLC 853537.
- Alpatov, Mikhail V. (1949). Всеобщая история искусств (in Russian). Vol. 2. Moscow, Leningrad: Iskusstvo. p. 254.
- Althaus, Frank, ed. (2006). The Triumph of Eros: Art and Seduction in 18th-Century France (exhibition catalogue). London: Fontanka. pp. 55, 122–123, 127; cat. no. 86. ISBN 978-0-9543095-8-9. OCLC 122256097 – via the Internet Archive.
- Baldini, Umberto (1970) [first published in Italian in 1966]. The Hermitage, Leningrad. Great Galleries of the World. Translated by James Brockway. New York: Newsweek. p. 107. OCLC 92662 – via the Internet Archive.
- Barker, G. W. (1939). Antoine Watteau. London: Duckworth. p. 146. OCLC 556817570.
- Belova, Yuliya N. (2008). "Мнимое кокетство «Капризницы» Антуана Ватто". In Pakhsaryan, N. T. [in Russian] (ed.). XVIII век: женское/мужское в культуре эпохи (conference papers) (in Russian). Moscow: Ekon-Inform. pp. 23–28. ISBN 978-5-9506-0342-6.
- Belova, Yuliya N. (2010). "Обольщение как игра в XVIII веке". In Orlova, N. H. (ed.). Игровые практики культуры (conference papers) (in Russian). Saint Petersburg: Saint Petersburg University Press. pp. 143–147.
- Börsch-Supan, Helmut [in German] (2000). Antoine Watteau, 1684-1721. Meister der französischen Kunst (in German). Köln: Könemann. pp. 79, 94; fig. 69. ISBN 3-8290-1630-1. OCLC 925262301.
- Camesasca, Ettore [in Portuguese] (1971). The Complete Paintings of Watteau. Classics of the World's Great Art. New York: Harry N. Abrams. p. 107; cat. no. 116. ISBN 0-8109-5525-3. OCLC 143069 – via the Internet Archive.
- Chegodaev, A. D. [in Russian] (1963). Антуан Ватто [Antoine Watteau] (in Russian). Moscow: Iskusstvo. ill. 31. OCLC 40315312.
- Dacier, Émile; Vuaflart, Albert (1922). Jean de Julienne et les graveurs de Watteau au XVIII-e siècle. III. Catalogue (in French). Paris: M. Rousseau. p. 127, no. 303. doi:10.11588/DIGLIT.41977. OCLC 1039156495.
- Daniel, S. M. [in Russian] (2010). Рококо: От Ватто до Фрагонара (in Russian) (2nd ed.). Saint Petersburg: Azbuka-Klassika. pp. 80–82. ISBN 978-5-9985-0651-2. OCLC 766099212.
- Descargues, Pierre (1961). The Hermitage Museum, Leningrad. New York: Harry N. Abrams. pp. 68, 168–169. OCLC 829900432.
- Dukelskaya, Larissa; Moore, Andrew (2002). A Capital Collection: Houghton Hall and the Hermitage (exhibition catalogue). New Haven, London: Yale University Press for the State Hermitage Museum and the Paul Mellon Centre for Studies in British Art. ISBN 0-300-09758-1.
- Eidelberg, Martin (May 1969). "Watteau's 'La Boudeuse'". The Burlington Magazine. 111 (794): 275–278. JSTOR 875934.
- Eidelberg, Martin (September 1975). "Watteau Paintings in England in the Early Eighteenth Century". The Burlington Magazine. 117 (870): 576–583. JSTOR 878129.
- Eidelberg, Martin (October 24, 2013). "Philippe Mercier, Watteau's English Follower". Watteau and His Circle. Archived from the original on December 6, 2020.
- Eidelberg, Martin (August 2016). "La Boudeuse". A Watteau Abecedario. Archived from the original on October 3, 2019.
- Ernst, Serge [in Russian] (March 1928). "L'exposition de peinture française des XVIIe et XVIIIe siecles au musée de l'Ermitage, a Petrograd (1922–1925)". Gazette des Beaux-Arts (in French). Vol. 17, no. 785. pp. 163–182 – via Gallica.
- Fedotova, E. D. (2002). Антуан Ватто (in Russian). Moscow: Белый город. pp. 18, 27. ISBN 5-7793-0471-8. OCLC 445775543.
- Fourcaud, Louis de (November 1904). "Antoine Watteau: scenes et figures galantes". La Revue de l'art ancien et moderne (in French). 16 (92): 341–356 – via the Internet Archive.
- German, M. Y. (1980). Antoine Watteau (art book). Masters of World Painting. New York: Harry N. Abrams. ISBN 0-8109-2221-5. OCLC 6998113 – via the Internet Archive.
- German, M. Y. (2010) [first published in 1980]. Антуан Ватто [Antoine Watteau] (in Russian). Moscow: Iskusstvo—XXI vek. ISBN 978-5-98051-067-1. OCLC 641954308.
- Glorieux, Guillaume (2002). À l'enseigne de Gersaint: Edme-François Gersaint, marchand d'art sur le pont Notre-Dame (1694-1750) (in French). Seysell: Editions Champ Vallon. p. 233. ISBN 2-87673-344-7. OCLC 401692541 – via Google Books.
- Glorieux, Guilliaume (Autumn 2006). "L'Angleterre et Watteau au XVIII e siècle: La réception de la fête galante par les amateurs anglais". The British Art Journal (in French). 7 (2): 50–55. JSTOR 41614690.
- Glorieux, Guillaume (2011). Watteau. Collection Les Phares (in French). Paris: Citadelles & Mazenod. p. 195. ISBN 978-2-85088-340-8. OCLC 711039378.
- Goncourt, Edmond de (1875). Catalogue raisonné de l'oeuvre peint, dessiné et gravé d'Antoine Watteau (in French). Paris: Rapilly. pp. 107–108. OCLC 1041772738 – via the Internet Archive.
- Goncourt, Edmond de; Goncourt, Jules de (1880) [1860]. L'art du dix-huitième siècle. 1^{er} fasc.: Watteau (in French) (3rd ed.). Paris: A. Quantin. p. 57. OCLC 1157138267 – via the Internet Archive.
- Grasselli, Margaret Morgan; Rosenberg, Pierre & Parmantier, Nicole (1984). Watteau, 1684-1721 (PDF) (exhibition catalogue). Washington: National Gallery of Art. ISBN 0-89468-074-9. OCLC 557740787 – via the National Gallery of Art archive.
- Grigorovich, Dmitry V. (1875). "Дом графа П. С. Строганова". Пчела (in Russian). pp. 8–9, 11–12, 26–28, 39–41, 49–52. Also published as Hermitage Museum 2019, pp. 37–58.
- Hermitage Museum, Leningrad (1958). Отдел западноевропейского искусства: Каталог живописи: в 2 т. (in Russian). Vol. 1. Leningrad, Moscow: Iskusstvo. p. 270. OCLC 50467017.
- Hermitage Museum, Leningrad (1976). Западноевропейская живопись: в 2 т. (in Russian). Vol. 1. Leningrad: Aurora. p. 189. OCLC 995091183.
- Hermitage Museum, Saint Petersburg (2003). Строгановы: меценаты и коллекционеры (exhibition catalogue) (in Russian). Saint Petersburg: Slavia. pp. 90 (repr.), 102, 256, 263; cat. no. 153. ISBN 5-9501-0031-X.
- Hermitage Museum, Saint Petersburg (2019). Забытый русский меценат. Собрание графа Павла Сергеевича Строганова [A Forgotten Russian Patron: The Collection of Count Pavel Sergeevich Stroganov] (exhibition catalogue) (in Russian). Saint Petersburg: State Hermitage Publishers. ISBN 978-5-93572-862-5. OCLC 1128093154.
- Herold, Jacques; Vuaflart, Albert (1929). Jean de Julienne et les graveurs de Watteau au XVIII-e siècle. I. Notices et documents biographiques (in French). Paris: M. Rousseau. pp. 102–103, 266. doi:10.11588/DIGLIT.41975. OCLC 1039157338.
- Hunter-Stiebel, Penelope, ed. (2000). Stroganoff: The Palace and Collections of a Russian Noble Family (exhibition catalogue). Portland, Or.: Portland Art Museum in collaboration with Harry N. Abrams. pp. 86, 127, 218, 223; cat. no. 133. ISBN 0-8109-4196-1. OCLC 1151338660 – via the Internet Archive.
- Huyghe, René (1970) [1950]. Watteau: The Artist and His Drawings. Translated by Barbara Bray. New York: Braziller. p. 114. ISBN 978-0-269-02709-3. OCLC 556662493 – via the Internet Archive. For the original French edition, see Adhémar 1950, pp. 1–60.
- Ingamells, John & Raines, Robert (1976–1978). "A Catalogue of the Paintings, Drawings and Etchings of Philip Mercier". The Walpole Society. XLVI: 1–70. JSTOR 41829356.
- Kuznetsov, S. O. (2007). "Открытие ради спасения. Национализация Строгоновского дома в 1919 г." Вестник Санкт-Петербургского университета. Серия 2: История (in Russian) (2): 151–156 – via CyberLeninka.
- Lauterbach, Iris (2008). Antoine Watteau, 1684-1721. Back to Visual Basics. Köln: Taschen. pp. 61, 64. ISBN 978-3-8228-5318-4. OCLC 1164836547 – via the Internet Archive.
- Lourie, Samuil; Halperin, Mark (Summer 2002). "The Entertainments of Antoine Watteau". The Threepenny Review. No. 90. p. 23. ISSN 0275-1410. JSTOR 4385148. For the original Russian text, see Lurie 1975.
- Lurie, Samuil (December 1975). "Забавы Антуана Ватто". Аврора (in Russian). No. 12. p. 68.
- Lurie, Samuil (2012). "Забавы Антуана Ватто". Железный бульвар (in Russian). Saint Petersburg: Azbuka-Attikus. pp. 151–156. ISBN 978-5-389-02738-1. OCLC 999563609.
- Makhlina, S. T. [in Russian]; Lyahovitzky, A. B. (1989). ""Сьер Ватто, живописец"". Музыкальная жизнь (in Russian). Vol. 16, no. 762. pp. 22–24. ISSN 0131-2383.
- Makhlina, S. T. (1995). Язык искусства в контексте культуры (in Russian). Saint Petersburg: State Academy of Culture. p. 146.
- Markov, A. V. (2019). ""Капризница" Антуана Ватто: среда самоопределения современной русской поэзии". Практики и интерпретации (in Russian). 4 (2): 67–78. doi:10.23683/2415-8852-2019-2-67-78. ISSN 2415-8852.
- Mathey, Jacques (1959). Antoine Watteau. Peintures réapparues inconnues ou négligées par les historiens (in French). Paris: F. de Nobele. pp. 17, 68. OCLC 954214682.
- Miller, V. F. (1923). "Французская живопись XVII-го и XVIII-го в.в. в новых залах Эрмитажа". Город (in Russian). No. 1. pp. 52–78. OCLC 32361994.
- Montagni, E. C. (1968). L'opera completa di Watteau. Classici dell'arte (in Italian). Vol. 21. Milano: Rizzoli. p. 106; cat. no. 116. OCLC 1006284992. For the English edition, see Camesasca 1971.
- Nedoshivin, G. A.; Petrova, O. N. (1980). Сто встреч в мире искусства (in Russian). Moscow: Molodaya Gvardiya. p. 61. OCLC 20321104.
- Nemilova, Inna S. (1964). Ватто и его произведения в Эрмитаже (Watteau et son œuvre à l'Ermitage) [Watteau and His Works in the Hermitage] (in Russian). Leningrad: Sovetskiy hudozhnik. OCLC 67871342.
- Nemilova, I. S. (1982). Французская живопись XVIII века в Эрмитаже (La peinture française du XVIIIe siècle, Musée de L'Ermitage: catalogue raisonné) [French Painting of the 18th centrty in the Hermitage Museum: Scientific Catalogue] (in Russian). Leningrad: Iskusstvo.
- Nemilova, I. S. (1985a). Французская живопись XVIII века [French Painting of the 18th Century] (art book). Государственный Эрмитаж. Собрание живописи (in Russian). Moscow: Izobrazitel'noe iskusstvo. pp. 242–243. OCLC 878889718.
- Nemilova, I. S. (1985b). A. S. Kantor-Gukovskaya (ed.). Французская живопись. XVIII век [French Painting: the 18th Century]. Государственный Эрмитаж. Собрание западноевропейской живописи: научный каталог в 16 томах (in Russian). Vol. 10. Leningrad: Iskusstvo. pp. 455–456; cat. no. 354. OCLC 22896528.
- Neverov, O. Y.; Alexinsky, D. P. (2010). The Hermitage. Vol. 1: The Treasures of World Art. New York, Milan, St. Petersburg: Rizzoli, ARCA Publishers. p. 285. ISBN 978-0-8478-3503-4. OCLC 1193944908 – via the Internet Archive.
- Opperman, Hal (June 1988). "Watteau 1684-1721 by Margaret Morgan Grasselli, Pierre Rosenberg and Nicole Parmentier". The Art Bulletin. 70 (2): 354–359. JSTOR 3051127.
- Parker, Karl T. & Mathey, Jacques (1957–1958). Antoine Watteau: catalogue complet de son oeuvre dessiné (in French). Paris: F. de Nobèle. vol. 2, p. 342, cat. no. 749. OCLC 2039948.
- Portalis, Roger; Béraldi, Henri (1882). "Mercier (Pierre)". Les graveurs du dix-huitième siècle [Engravers of the Eighteenth Century] (in French). Vol. 3 (pt. 1). Paris: D. Morgand et C. Fatout. p. 82 – via the Internet Archive.
- Posner, Donald (1984). Antoine Watteau. Ithaca, NY: Cornell University Press. pp. 111, 283. ISBN 0-8014-1571-3. OCLC 10736607 – via the Internet Archive.
- Raines, Robert (February 1977). "Watteaus and 'Watteaus' in England before 1760". Gazette des Beaux-Arts: 51–64.
- Ramade, Patrick & Eidelberg, Martin P. (2004). Watteau et la fête galante: Musée des beaux-arts de Valenciennes, 5 mars-14 juin 2004 (exhibition catalogue) (in French). Paris: Réunion des musées nationaux. pp. 168–170; cat. no. 43. ISBN 2-7118-4677-6. OCLC 492866933.
- Raymond, Florence, ed. (2013). Antoine Watteau (1684-1721): la leçon de musique (exhibition catalogue) (in French). Paris: Skira Flammarion. cat. no. 9. ISBN 978-2-0812-9583-4. OCLC 934385505.
- Réau, Louis [in French] (1928). "Catalogue de l'art français dans les musées russes". Bulletin de la Société de l'histoire de l'art français (in French): 167–314 – via Gallica. Cat. no. 417.
- Réau, Louis (1928–1930). "Watteau". In Dimier, Louis (ed.). Les peintres français du XVIII-e siècle: Histoire des vies et catalogue des œuvres (in French). Vol. 1. Paris: G. Van Oest. p. 39, cat. no. 101. OCLC 564527521.
- Réau, Louis (1931). Histoire de l'expansion de l'art français; pays scandinaves, Angleterre, Amérique du Nord (in French). Paris: H. Laurens. p. 159. OCLC 457584973.
- Rey, Robert (1931). Quelques satellites de Watteau (in French). Paris: Librairie de France. pp. 89–90, 92. OCLC 3143135.
- Roland Michel, Marianne (1980). Antoine Watteau: das Gesamtwerk (in German). Translated by Rudolf Kimmig. Frankfurt: Ullstein. p. 60; cat. no. 163. ISBN 3-548-36019-X. OCLC 69202887.
- Roland Michel, Marianne (1984). Watteau: An Artist of the Eighteenth Century. London: Trefoil. pp. 186, 275. ISBN 0-86294-049-4.
- Roland Michel, Marianne (1986). "Watteau and England". In Hind, Charles (ed.). The Rococo in England. London: Victoria and Albert Museum. pp. 46–59. ISBN 0-948107-37-5. OCLC 18588917.
- Rosenberg, Pierre; Prat, Louis-Antoine (1996). Antoine Watteau: catalogue raisonné des dessins (in French). Paris: Gallimard-Electa. vol. 1, p. 532; cat. no. 332. ISBN 2-07-015043-7. OCLC 463981169.
- Shapiro, Y. G. (1989). The Hermitage, Leningrad. Picture Gallery. Leningrad: Aurora Art Publishers. pp. 112–113. ISBN 5-7300-0081-2 – via the Internet Archive.
- Slepyshev, A. S. [in Russian] (2004). Рукотворная красота (in Russian). Moscow: Materik. ISBN 5-85646-142-8. OCLC 644097710.
- Snodin, Michael, ed. (2009). Horace Walpole's Strawberry Hill (exhibition catalogue). London; New Haven: Lewis Walpole Library. 52, 322; cat. no. 192. ISBN 978-0-300-12574-0. LCCN 2009024158.
- Sterling, Charles (1958). Great French Painting in the Hermitage. Translated by Christopher Ligota. New York: Harry N. Abrams. p. 212. OCLC 598217 – via the Internet Archive.
- Temperini, Renaud (2002). Watteau. Maîtres de l'art (in French). Paris: Gallimard. pp. 55, 142; cat. no. 44. ISBN 2-07-011686-7. OCLC 300225840.
- Vidal, Mary (1992). Watteau's Painted Conversations: Art, Literature, and Talk in Seventeenth- and Eighteenth-Century France. New Haven, London: Yale University Press. pp. 24–25, 27, fig. 28. ISBN 0-300-05480-7. OCLC 260176725.
- Walpole, Horace (1784) [1774]. A description of the villa of Mr. Horace Walpole, youngest son of Sir Robert Walpole Earl of Orford, at Strawberry-Hill near Twickenham, Middlesex: with an inventory of the furniture, pictures, curiosities, &c. Strawberry-Hill: Th. Kirgate. OCLC 1042937948 – via the Internet Archive.
- Zimmermann, Ernst Heinrich [in German] (1912). Watteau: des Meisters Werke in 182 Abbildungen. Klassiker der Kunst (in German). Vol. 21. Stuttgart, Leipzig: Deutsche Verlags-Anstalt. reproduced at p. 41, note at p. 187. OCLC 561124140 – via the Internet Archive.
- Zolotov, Yuri K. [in Russian], ed. (1973). Антуан Ватто [Antoine Watteau: a reproductions album] (альбом репродукций) (in Russian). Leningrad: Aurora.
- Zolotov, Yuri K., ed. (1985). Antoine Watteau: Paintings and Drawings from Soviet Museums. Translated by Vladimir Pozner. Leningrad: Aurora Publishers. pp. 21, 25, 110; ill. 44–47. OCLC 249485317.
