= Oleg Sohanievich =

Ukrainian-American artist (1935–2017)

Oleg Sohanievich (January 7, 1935, Tulchin, Ukraine – October 22, 2017, New York) was a Ukrainian-American abstract artist, sculptor and poet best known for his escape from the USSR on an inflatable rowboat to Turkey.

== Early life and education ==
Both parents were engineers. His teenage artworks were shown to Igor Grabar who recommended Oleg Sohanievich to be admitted to the Art School in Kyiv. After graduating from the art school got admitted to Mukhin Art School in Leningrad, and transferred to Ilya Repin Leningrad Institute for Painting, Sculpture and Architecture which he graduated from in 1962.

== Escape from the USSR ==
Sohanevich's art was highly criticized by the Soviet authorities for being abstract and not following Soviet art guidelines. His art career and artistic development was not possible under such restraints. Authorities would refuse permission to exhibit his work. Sohanievich firmly decided to leave the USSR, and since he had no legal means to get abroad, he decided on an extremely dangerous escape by sea.

In 1965, he made an unsuccessful attempt to reach Turkey by swimming from a beach near Batumi. With only 11 miles to Turkey, the border was extremely well guarded. Sohanievich hid his clothes under the rock on the beach and started swimming hiding his had with the hoody from border patrol lights scanning the area. Unluckily the strong current was fighting his progress and he finally gave up and returned to the shore.

This failure did not lessen his desire to escape. On August 7, 1967, he and his friend who decided to run away with him climbed overboard the Rossiya cruise liner, which was making a flight between Yalta and Novorossiysk. In the water, they inflated a rubber boat hidden in a bag and began to row south. On the ninth day, they reached the Turkish coast, having swum over 300 km in 119 hours. Soon Sohanievich was allowed to emigrate to the United States.

== Career ==
From 1969 to 1970, Sohanievich was a Fellow at MacDowell art colony.

Sohanievich has lived in New York. The aura of New York, it's skyscrapers and East Village culture has made a significant impact on Sohanievich's artistic vision. In 1972, in his own words, he has picked a piece of metal from the street, started bending it with his hands and created a sculpture, which among others, made by him in a short period of time was exhibited in a group show in Union Carbide building in 1972.

In 1973, Sohanievich had joined "14 Sculptors" gallery in SoHo, organizing solo exhibitions every 10 months for 4 years.

In 1975, participated in a group show "Russian Emigre Artists" at the Andre Emmerich Gallery. John Russel spoke highly of his artwork in his articles in the NYTimes both in December 1975 and March 1976. Amei Wallach reviewed the exhibition in 1976.

In 1979, participated in a group show at Frank Marina Gallery in New York. The exhibition was reviewed in ArtNews in September 1979 and by Robbie Enrich in Art Magazine in 1979, page 34.

In 1986, group show "Russians in America" at "Gallery International 52" with Mihail Chemiakine, Oleg Tselkov, Ernst Neizvestny, Vitaly Dlugy and others.

In 2004, solo exhibition at Caestecker Art Gallery, C.J. Rodman Center for the Arts at Ripon College, Wisconsin.

In the US, Sohanievich worked as a mover in order to support himself and create art that did not depend on commerce.

Sohanievich referred to the art style of his paintings as "Abstract Minimalism" and his sculptures as "Stress sculpture".

== Public Collections ==
- Zimmerli Art Museum at Rutgers University, New Brunswick, USA
- Nasher Museum of Art at Duke University, North, USA
- State Russian Museum, St. Petersburg
- C. J. Rodman Center for the Arts at Ripon College, Wisconsin
- The Kolodzei Art Foundation, US
- The Tabakman Collection, US
