= Georgy Kovenchuk =

Russian painter

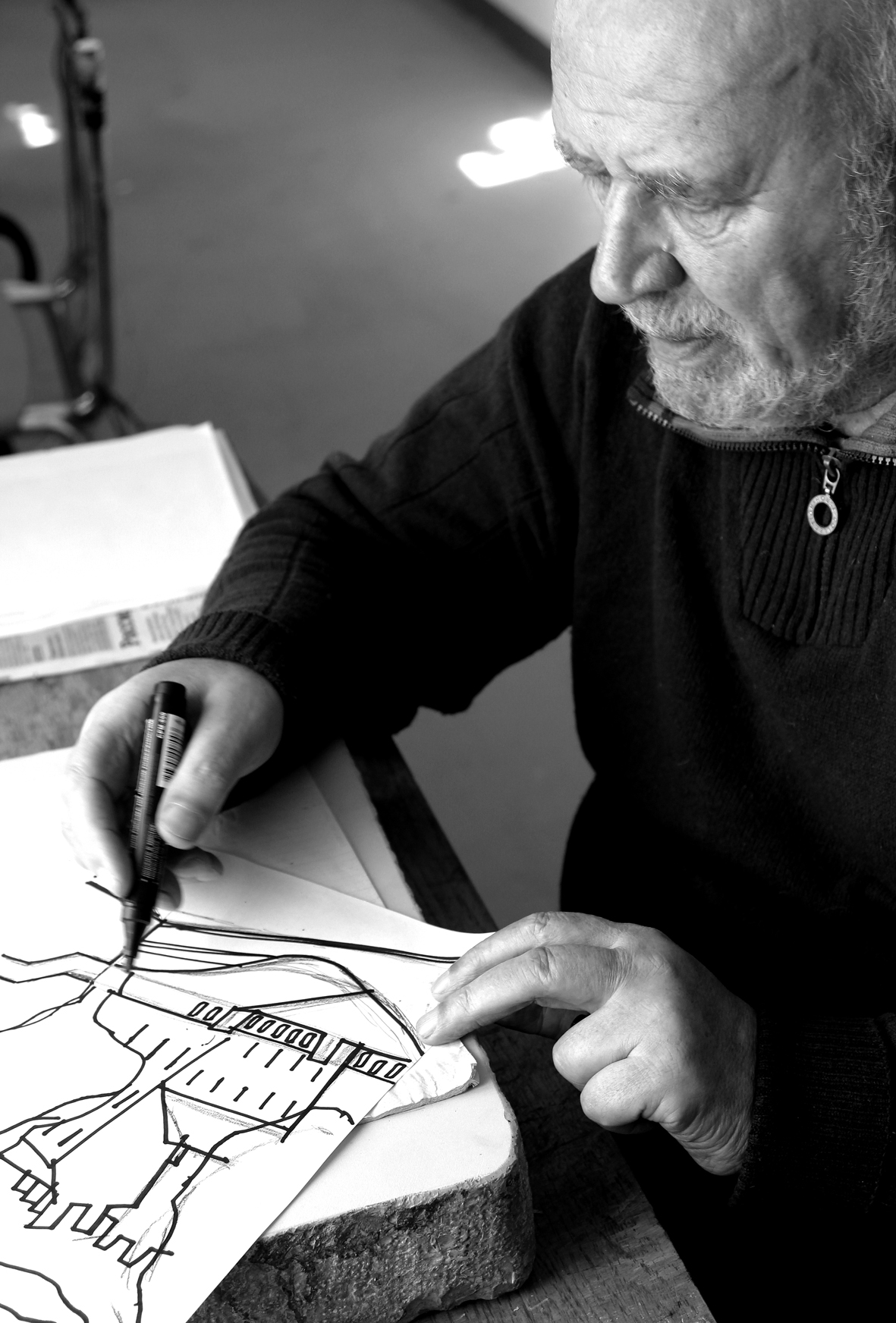
- Born: Georgy Vasilyevich Kovenchuk; December 2, 1933; Leningrad, USSR
- Died: February 3, 2015 (aged 81); St. Petersburg, Russia
- Education: St. Petersburg State Academic Institute of Fine Arts, Sculpture and Architecture
- Known for: Painting

Gaga (Georgy Vasilyevich) Kovenchuk (Russian: Гага (Георгий Васильевич) Ковенчук; 2 December 1933 — 3 February 2015) was a Soviet-Russian artist and writer. Gaga was an artist, painter, graphic artist, book artist and poster artist, printmaker (etching, aquatint, lithography, linocut, woodcut, monotype, silkscreen, stencil), engaged in ceramics. Honored artist of Russia, member of the graphics section of the Saint Petersburg Union of Artists, member of the Union of journalists. Member of the creative Association of poster artists "Боевой карандаш" (Battle pencil).

== Biography ==
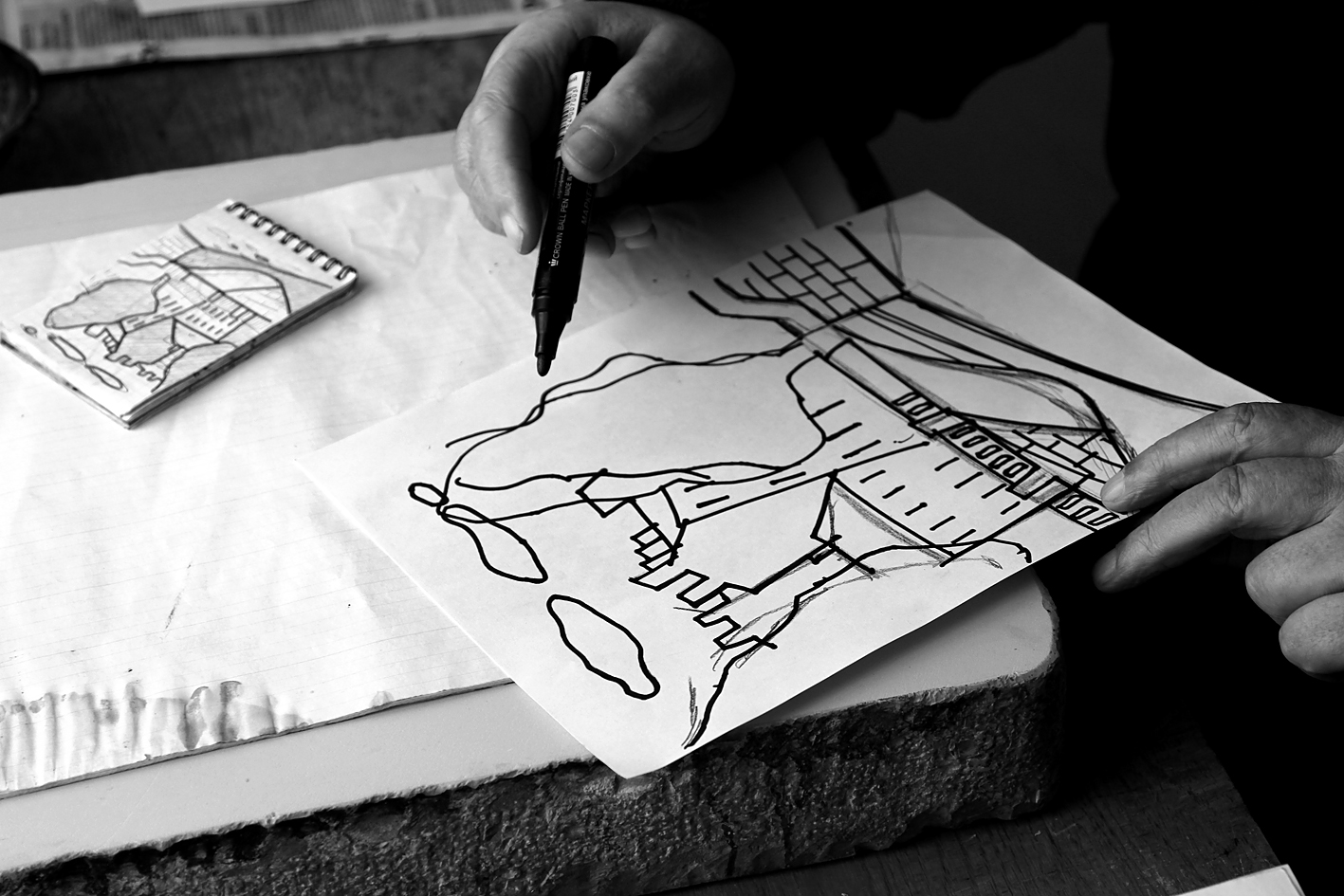
SPb. 17.04/2013. Gaga Kovenchuk draws.

Gaga was born in Leningrad 2 of December 1933. Gaga's mother Nina Nikolaevna Kovenchuk was theater artist (worked in the theater Akimov). Gaga's grandfather Nikolai Kulbin avant-garde artist. Georgy Kovenchuk studied in Leningrad Secondary Art School, then at the graphic faculty of the Leningrad Institute of painting, sculpture and architecture named after I. E. Repin, in the workshop of A. F. Pakhomov (1954-1960). He defended his diploma with a series of posters. The artist painted a lot as an Illustrator for publishers and magazines such as Aurora, Koster, Murzilka (since 1975) and others. Four years worked as a chief artist n the magazine "Aurora" (1969-1972). Kovenchuk worked as a book artist throughout his life, illustrating the works of Russian writers of the XX century, some of these books were published abroad (for example a collection of short stories by Mikhail Zoshchenko in 2011 was published in Japan). The most famous feature of the book: "From the notebooks" by Ilya Ilf (several editions) and published in an edition of 30,000 copies of "The Bedbug" by Vladimir Mayakovsky. George Kovenchuk was awarded the diploma "Best book of the year" (1975); silver medal of the international Biennale of graphics in Brno (Czech Republic, 1994) for graphics for the Comedy Vladimir Mayakovsky "The Bedbug".

In 2013 was published a new author's version of "The Bedbug" a limited edition (50 + 20 copies) in the format of the Artist's book (printed by silkscreen).

Georgy Kovenchuk traveled a lot in the 1980s and 2000s. On a regular basis for many years he lived and worked in France, Paris and other European countries (Sweden, England, Germany, Poland, Monaco, Finland, etc.), the USA, Japan and China, Tunisia. A special place in the artist's creative heritage is occupied by the picturesque and graphic series of works created in Paris on the Rue Lepic (such as Moulin Rouge). The artist throughout his life he met, worked, communicated or made joint creative projects with many outstanding people of that time, among them were: Nikolay Akimov, Georg Solti, Aleksei Kruchenykh, Alexei Khvostenko, Oleg Tselkov, Marc Chagall, Lilya Brik, Marlene Dietrich, Otar Iosseliani, Bulat Okudzhava, Daniil Granin, Sergei Dovlatov, Andrei Bitov, Jan Kubíček.

Gaga was awarded the silver medal of the Russian Academy of Arts in 2003.

George V. Kovenchuk died in St. Petersburg on 3 February 2015. The artist was buried at the Smolensky Cemetery in St. Petersburg.

== Museum collections ==
- State Tretyakov Gallery, Moscow.
- State Russian Museum, Saint Petersburg.
- National Library of Russia. Department of prints, Saint Petersburg.
- State Museum of the History of St. Petersburg. Saint Petersburg.
- Museum of art of Saint Petersburg of the XX-XXI centuries. Saint Petersburg Manege. St. Petersburg.
- State Museum of V. V. Mayakovsky. Moscow.
- State Museum and exhibition center "ROSIZO". Moscow.
- Tambov art gallery, Tambov.
- Kursk regional art gallery named after A. A. Deineka, Kursk.
- Sakhalin regional state art Museum, Yuzhno-Sakhalinsk.
- A. Kasteyev State Museum of Arts (Almaty).
- Moravian Gallery in Brno.(Czech).
- Spencer Museum of Art. (USA).
- Zimmerli Art Museum. (USA).
- Les Musees de La Citadelle. (Villefranche-sur-Mer, Francais).
- Kolodzei Art Foundation. (USA).
- Museum of Russian Art. (USA).

== Selected solo exhibitions ==
- GAGA Georgy Vasilyevich Kovenchuk. 1933-2015. Marble Palace. State Russian Museum, St. Petersburg, 2015.
- George (Gaga) Kovenchuk. I.B. Clark Gallery (New Hope, Pennsylvania). 2015.
- Gaga's drawing a "The Bedbug". KGallery, St. Petersburg, 2013;
- I called myself Gaga. Blue drawing-room. Saint Petersburg Union of Artists, St. Petersburg, 2012;
- Two of the artist (with his son Alexey Kulbin). Nabokov House, St. Petersburg, 2012;
- George Kovenchuk. Interference-Japan and not only... AYA Gallery, St. Petersburg, 2007;
- That South. Oh, this Nice ... Kursk state art gallery named after A. A. Deineki, 2007;
- That South. Oh, this Nice ... Tambov regional art gallery, 2006;
- Kovenchuk. Matisse club gallery, St. Petersburg, 2005;
- GAGA. Galerie Pastor Gismondi (Monte Carlo, Monaco, 2004, 2005);
- Hit the Moulin Rouge. Matisse club gallery, St. Petersburg, 2003;
- George Kovenchuk. World perception. Marble Palace. State Russian Museum, 2002;
- GAGA. Galerie "W", Paris (2002, 2003);
- Works Of George Kovenchuk. Borey, St. Petersburg, 2000;
- GAGA. Galerie "W", Paris, 1998;
- GAGA. Galerie Alexander, Berlin, 1998;
- GAGA. Galerie Perspective, Heuchelheim, Germany, 1997;
- GAGA. Fine Art Gallery, London, 1990;
- GAGA. Galerie Aronowitsch i Trosa Kvarn, Trosa, Sweden (1988, 1989, 1990);
- Works Of George Kovenchuk. V. z. Writers ' houses, St. Petersburg, 1982;
- George Kovenchuk. V. Z. journal of Avrora, SPb, 1981;
- Works Of George Kovenchuk. Shop "Leningrad", St. Petersburg, 1977;
- Works Of George Kovenchuk. Coffee house Summer Garden, St. Petersburg, 1971.

== Bibliography ==
- Borovsky, A., Kassel N. Brochure of the exhibition in the marble Palace of the state Russian Museum. Georgy Vasilyevich (GAGA) Kovenchuk. 1933-2015. B. D., b. ed. [2015]. Shooting gallery. 500 copies. (Rus).
- Grigoryants E., Parygin A. books-diaries of Gaga Kovenchuk. - St. Petersburg art history books, issue 37, St. Petersburg: AIS, 2015. - P. 12-17;
- Parygin A. New bedbug of Gaga Kovenchuk. - Petersburg art history books, issue 29, St. Petersburg: AIS, 2014. (Rus).
- Parygin A. Kovenčuk, Georgij Vasil'evič // Allgemeines Künstlerlexikon Die Bildenden Künstler aller Zeiten und Völker. — Walter de Gruyter. Band 81: — 2013. (in German lang.);
- Kovenchuk G., Borovsky A., Parygin A. Georgy Kovenchuk (Gaga) draws "The Bedbug" (book-album). — SPb: Publishing House. Timofey Markov. 2013. — 160 p., Col. slime. (Rus).
- Parygin A.B. Play "Bedbug" by Vladimir Mayakovsky in the chart Komenuka G. V. // Bulletin of St. Petersburg GUTD. — 2013. — Series 3. № 4, St. Petersburg: St. Petersburg GUTD, 2013. - P. 80-84. (Rus).
- Katayama, Fue. GAGA as GAKA: Georgia Kovenchuk, the successor of Russian Futurist [Gaga as an artist]. Tokyo, 2013. - 192 p. + 32 CW Il. (Japanese lang.);
- Gerasimenko P. The Bedbug. Projector Magazine № 3 (24), 2013. - P. 98-103. (Rus).
- Borovsky A. The Funny name. North pencil (articles about graphic). SPb. 2012. — P. 64-74. (Rus).
- Eliseev N. Scroll of memories // Expert, 2012. № 9 (555). (Rus).
- Petrov E. As an artist became a writer // Arguments and Facts Petersburg. — 2012. (Rus).
- Shelukhina E. N. Gaga and Solti // In the book: Sir Georg Solti. Meeting with Russia. M.: Ed. G. A. Saamov, 2012. — 160 p., ISBN 978-5-902534-09-9. (Rus).
- Kuznetsov E. Comes from the sixties. In proc. the Countess leaves the ball (articles and memoirs). M., 2010. — P. 306-314. (Rus). — ISBN 978-5-87334-125-2. (Rus).
- Tarasova M. Georgy Vasilyevich Kovenchuk // Russian art (magazine), 2007.
- Mikhail German George Kovenchuk (Exhibition catalog. "Matisse Club"). — St. Petersburg: Mathis Club. 2005. — 32 p. [without pagination]. (Rus).
- Magalashvili A. Visit the futurist // Art & Times (magazine), 2004, № 1 (12) — P. 18-20. (Rus).
- St. Petersburg faces: Family album / L. K. Pleskacheva. — St. Petersburg: PR-Partner, 2003. — 559 p. (Rus).
- Borovsky A. The Funny name. // St. Petersburg Address (magazine) № 5/17, 2003. (Rus).
- Kozyreva N. Heir in a straight line // Aurora (magazine), 1993, # 10-12. — P. 136-147. (Rus).
- Kowalska B. Dziad i wnuk // Projekt (magazine), 1988, No. 2 (179) — S. 20-23 (in Polish).
- Shashkin M. In the Workshops: Georgy Kovenchuk // Soviet Graphics (magazine). — No. 9, 1982, — P. 100-105. (Rus).
- Dovlatov S. Solo on Underwood: Notebooks — Paris: The Third Wave, 1980. (Rus).
- Booklet-invitation to the exhibition of Georgy Vasilievich Kovenchuk (drawings, lithographs, engravings, etchings, illustrations). Introductory article — Neshataeva N. L.: Lenkniga. — 1977. (Rus).

== Texts By G. V. Kovenchuk ==
- I named myself Gaga (album book). — St. Petersburg: NP-Print, 2012. — 318 p. (Rus).
- In Leningrad Petersburg was more (interview) // Nevsky time. — March 22, 2011. (Rus).
- Apartment № 8 and other [collection of stories]. St. Petersburg: NP-Print, 2011 — 318 p. (Rus).
- From the artist's notes // Star. — 2009. - № 6. (Rus).
- What is formalism in painting and how the Soviet government fought against it // City 812. — May 12, 2009. (Rus).
- Landing in Monte Carlo // NoMI. — 2004. — N 4. (Rus).
- Month on BAM. Moscow: Soviet artist, 1978 — 74 p, Il. (Rus).
- About Petroleum. — Moscow: Detskaya Literatura, 1975. (Rus).
- For all who want to see (the anniversary of Henri Matisse) // Fire. — 1969. — № 12. (Rus).
