= Robert Rey =

Robert Rey may refer to:

- Robert Rey (ski jumper)
- Robert Rey (plastic surgeon)
- Robert Rey (art historian)
