= Leningrad Secondary Art School =

Art school in Saint Petersburg, Russia

Leningrad Secondary Art School (Russian: Ленингра́дская Сре́дняя худо́жественная шко́ла) was established in 1934 as the first art school for gifted children.

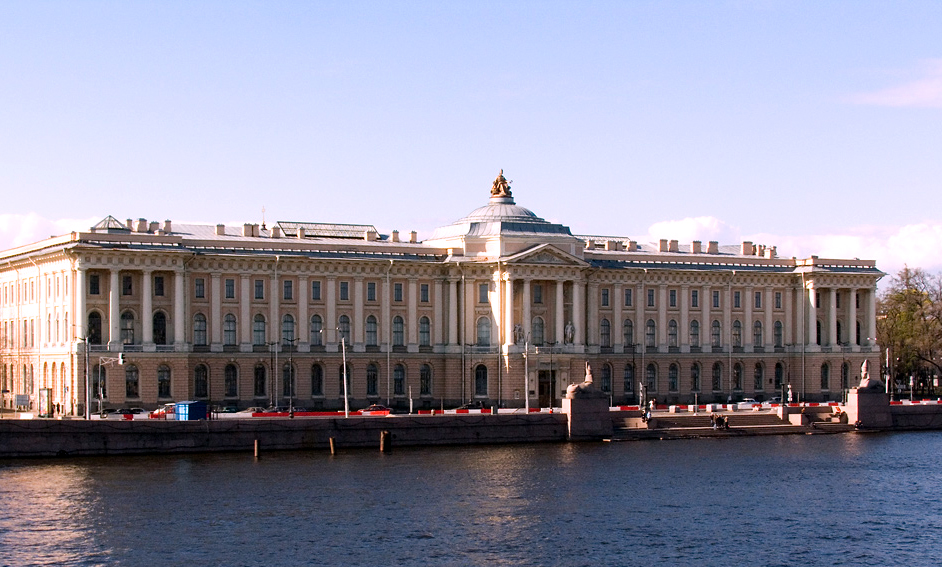
Imperial Academy of Arts

== History ==
The Leningrad Secondary Art School was founded in 1934 by the initiative of Leningrad communist party boss Sergei Kirov as the first in the Soviet Union art school for gifted children.

Located in the Academy of Arts building in Leningrad, in 1936 it was transformed into the Secondary Art School. In 1947 the Secondary Art School became a division of the USSR Academy of Arts which in 1973 was named after artist Boris Ioganson. Since 1992 it has been the B. Ioganson St. Petersburg State Academy Art Lyceum comprising three divisions: painting, sculpture and architecture.

Among its first teachers were mostly professors and teachers of the Academy of Arts: Vladimir Gorb, Samuil Nevelshtein, and others. The School boasts its such alumni as Mikhail Anikushin, Alexei Eriomin, Oleg Lomakin, Maya Kopitseva, Nikolai Pozdneev, Yuri Tulin, Mikhail Kaneev, Valentina Monakhova, Vladimir Chekalov, Georgy Kovenchuk, Marina Kozlovskaya, Elena Kostenko, Nina Veselova, Evgenia Antipova, Anatoli Levitin, Vecheslav Zagonek, and other.

The most gifted children with four-year experience in primary school are selected to become students of the Lyceum for the free-of-charge eight-year training. The Diploma of Secondary Art Education allows its graduates to enroll the higher art educational entities, including I. Repin St. Petersburg State Academy Institute of Painting, Sculpture and Architecture.

== Alumni ==
- Mikhail Konstantinovich Anikushin (1917 - 1997)
- Evgenia Petrovna Antipova (1917 - 2009)
- Yuri Vladimirovich Belov (b. 1929)
- Vladimir Fedorovich Chekalov (1922 - 1992)
- Abram Borisovich Grushko (1918 - 1980)
- Nikolai Matveevich Pozdneev (1930 - 1978)
- Mikhail Alexandrovich Kaneev (1923 - 1983)
- Georgy Vasilyevich Kovenchuk (1933-2015)
- Elena Mikhailovna Kostenko (b. 1926)
- Marina Andreevna Kozlovskaya (b. 1925)
- Tatiana Vladimirovna Kopnina (1921 - 2009)
- Maya Kuzminichna Kopitseva (1924 - 2005)
- Valentina Vasilievna Monakhova (b. 1932)
- Alexander Sergeevich Stolbov (b. 1929)
- Vladimir Stanislavovich Sakson (1927 - 1988)
- Yuri Nilovich Tulin (1921 - 1986)
- Alexander Tikhonovich Pushnin (1921 - 1991)
- Nina Veselova (1922 - 1960)
- Vecheslav Zagonek (1919 - 1994)

== Bibliography ==
- Львов Е. Таланты одной школы // Смена, 1940, 28 февраля.
- Митрохина Л., Кириллова Л. История создания Средней художественной школы // Петербургские искусствоведческие тетради. Вып. 16. СПб, 2009. С.48—69.
- Траугот В.Воспоминания о СХШ // Герои ленинградской культуры 1950—1980. СПб., ЦВЗ Манеж, 2005. С.174—176.
