= DISCUS =

DISCUS, or distributed source coding using syndromes, is a method for distributed source coding. It is a compression algorithm used to compress correlated data sources. The method is designed to achieve the Slepian–Wolf bound by using channel codes.

== History ==
DISCUS was invented by researchers S. S. Pradhan and K. Ramachandran, and first published in their paper "Distributed source coding using syndromes (DISCUS): design and construction", published in the IEEE Transactions on Information Theory in 2003.

== Variations ==
Many variations of DISCUS are presented in related literature. One such popular scheme is the Channel Code Partitioning scheme, which is an a-priori scheme, to reach the Slepian–Wolf bound. Many papers illustrate simulations and experiments on channel code partitioning using the turbo codes, Hamming codes and irregular repeat-accumulate codes.

== See also ==
- Modulo-N code is a simpler technique for compressing correlated data sources.
- Distributed source coding
