= The Embarrassing Proposal =

Painting by Antoine Watteau

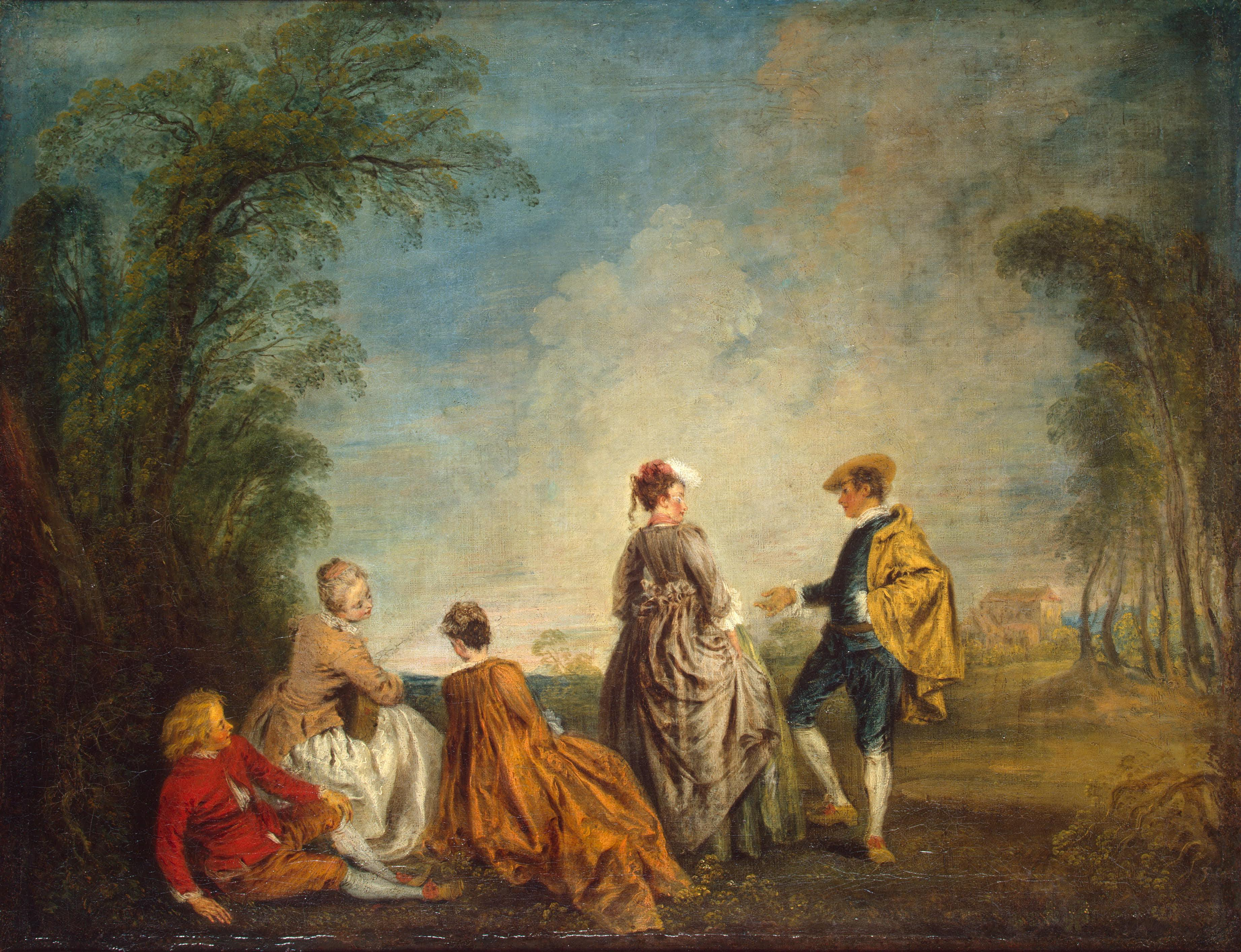
- Artist: Jean-Antoine Watteau
- Year: ca. 1715–1716
- Catalogue: H 130 (132); G 158; DV 274; R 129; HA 142; EC 146; RM 189
- Medium: oil on canvas
- Dimensions: 65 cm × 84.5 cm (26 in × 33.3 in)
- Location: The Hermitage; Saint Petersburg
- Accession: ГЭ-1150

The Embarrassing Proposal is a 1715-1716 painting by Antoine Watteau. It was part of Heinrich von Brühl's collection in Dresden before being purchased in 1769 under Catherine II of Russia for the Hermitage Museum, in Saint Petersburg, where it still hangs.

It shows a landscape with three young women and two young gallants. X-ray examination has shown the canvas was previously used for a composition with four people, including a woman playing a guitar and a young man, in the position now occupied by the three seated figures.

== Exhibition history ==
List of major exhibitions featuring the work
Year	Title	Location	Cat. no.	References	
Year	Title	Location	Cat. no.	Primary	Secondary
1955	An Exhibition of French Art of the 15th-20th Centuries	Pushkin Museum, Moscow	*		
1956	An Exhibition of French Art of the 12th-20th Centuries	Hermitage Museum, Leningrad	*		
1972	Watteau and His Time	Hermitage Museum, Leningrad	4		
1984–1985	Watteau 1684–1721	National Gallery of Art, Washington, D.C.; Galeries nationales du Grand Palais, Paris; Charlottenburg Palace, Berlin	P. 39		
1988	French Paintings from the USSR	National Gallery, London	2		
2005–2006	Russia!	Solomon R. Guggenheim Museum, New York City	44		
"*" denotes an unnumbered entry.

== Bibliography ==
- Adhemar, Helene (1950). Watteau; sa vie, son oeuvre (in French). Includes "L’univers de Watteau", an introduction by René Huyghe. Paris: P. Tisné. p. 144. OCLC 853537. Cat. no. 142, plate 73
- Camesasca, Ettore, ed. (1971). The Complete Paintings of Watteau (loan required). Classics of the World's Great Art. Introduction by John Sunderland. New York: Harry N. Abrams. p. 112. ISBN 0810955253. OCLC 143069 – via the Internet Archive. Cat. no. 146.
- Descargues, Pierre (1961). The Hermitage Museum, Leningrad. New York: Harry N. Abrams. pp. 31, 170. OCLC 829900432.
- Goncourt, Edmond de (1875). Catalogue raisonné de l'oeuvre peint, dessiné et gravé d'Antoine Watteau. Paris: Rapilly. p. 142. OCLC 1041772738 – via the Internet Archive.
- Grasselli, Margaret Morgan; Rosenberg, Pierre; Parmantier, Nicole; et al. (1984). Watteau, 1684-1721 (PDF) (exhibition catalogue). Washington: National Gallery of Art. ISBN 0-89468-074-9. OCLC 557740787 – via the National Gallery of Art archive.
- Hédouin, Pierre [in French] (November 30, 1845). "Watteau: catalogue de son oeuvre". L'Artiste (in French). pp. 78–80 – via Gallica. (p. 80, cat. no. 130.)
- Hédouin, Pierre (1856). Mosaïque. Peintres, musiciens, littérateurs, artistes dramatiques à partir du 15e siècle jusqu'à nos jours. Paris: Heugel. p. 107, cat. no. 132. OCLC 1157159285 – via the Internet Archive.
- Hildebrandt, Edmund (1923). Antoine Watteau (in German). Berlin: Propyläen-Verlag. p. 167, pl. 46. OCLC 1039987046 – via the Internet Archive.
- Mathey, Jacques (1959). Antoine Watteau. Peintures réapparues inconnues ou négligées par les historiens (in French). Paris: F. de Nobele. p. 68.
- Nemilova, I. S. (1964). Ватто и его произведения в Эрмитаже (Watteau et son œuvre à l'Ermitage) [Watteau and His Works in the Hermitage] (in Russian). Leningrad: Sovetskiy hudozhnik. OCLC 67871342.
- Nemilova, I. S. (1971). "К вопросу о творческом процессе Антуана Ватто (On the Question of Watteau's Creative Process)". In Libman M. Y.; et al. (eds.). Искусство Запада [Western Art] (in Russian). Moscow: Nauka. pp. 181–195. OCLC 707104089.
- Nemilova, I. S. (1982). Французская живопись XVIII века в Эрмитаже (La peinture française du XVIIIe siècle, Musée de L'Ermitage: catalogue raisonné) [French Painting of the 18th centrty in the Hermitage Museum: Scientific Catalogue]. Leningrad: Iskusstvo. pp. 139–140.
- Nemilova, I. S. (1985). Французская живопись XVIII века [French Painting of the 18th Century]. Государственный Эрмитаж. Собрание живописи (in Russian). Moscow: Izobrazitel'noe iskusstvo. p. 243. OCLC 878889718.
- Nemilova, I. S. (1989) [first published in 1973]. Загадки старых картин [Enigmas of Old Masters] (in Russian) (3rd ed.). Moscow: Izobrazitel'noe iskusstvo. ISBN 5-85200-017-5. OCLC 909190011.
- Posner, Donald (1984). Antoine Watteau. Ithaca, NY: Cornell University Press. pp. 285–286. ISBN 0-8014-1571-3. OCLC 10736607.
- Réau, Louis (1928–1930). "Watteau". In Dimier, Louis (ed.). Les peintres français du XVIII-e siècle: Histoire des vies et catalogue des œuvres (in French). Vol. 1. Paris: G. Van Oest. p. 41, cat. no. 129. OCLC 564527521.
- Roland Michel, Marianne (1980). Antoine Watteau: das Gesamtwerk (in German). Translated from the French by Rudolf Kimmig. Frankfurt: Ullstein. pp. 66, 68, cat. no. 189. ISBN 3-548-36019-X. OCLC 69202887.
- Somof, A. [in Russian] (1903). Ermitage imperial. Catalogue de la Galerie des tableaux. Troisième partie: école anglaise et ècole française. St. Petersburg: La Companie d'Imprimerie artistique. p. 107, cat. no. 1501 – via the Internet Archive.
- Sterling, Charles (1958). Great French Painting in the Hermitage. Translated from French by Christopher Ligota. New York: Harry N. Abrams. OCLC 598217.
- Weiner, P. P. von [in Russian], ed. (1923). Meisterwerke der Gemäldesammlung in der Eremitage zu Petrograd (in German). München: F. Hanfstaengl. p. 287. OCLC 741513217 – via the Internet Archive.
- Zimmermann, E. Heinrich (1912). Watteau: des Meisters Werke in 182 Abbildungen. Klassiker der Kunst (in German). Vol. 21. Stuttgart, Leipzig: Deutsche Verlags-Anstalt. pp. 13, 185–186.
- Zolotov, Y. K. [in Russian], ed. (1973). Антуан Ватто [Antoine Watteau: a reproductions album] (альбом репродукций) (in Russian). Leningrad: Aurora. pp. 143–144.
