= Oleg Tselkov =

Russian nonconformist artist (1934–2021)

- Born: Целков, Олег Николаевич; 15 July 1934; Moscow Region, Russian SFSR, Soviet Union
- Died: 11 July 2021 (aged 86); Paris, France
- Education: Belarus Theatrical institute, Minsk; Imperial Academy of Arts, Leningrad; Leningrad Theater institute
- Known for: painting, graphics, sculpture
- Movement: expressionism Sots Art

Oleg Nikolayevich Tselkov (Russian: Оле́г Никола́евич Целко́в; 15 July 1934 — 11 July 2021) was a Russian nonconformist artist, celebrated for his images of faces painted in bright color, depicting inner psychological patterns of violence in contemporary culture.

== Biography ==
In 1956 he had his first apartment exhibition in the Vladimir Slepyan (1930–1998) houseroom. In 1958 he graduated from the Saint Petersburg State Theatre Arts Academy, where he studied under experimental scenic designer and theatre director Nikolay Akimov. In the 1960s and 1970s, the Tselkov studio in Moscow was visited over the years by such celebrities as, Arthur Miller, David Alfaro Siqueiros, Renato Guttuso, Lilya Brik, Anna Akhmatova, Joseph Brodsky, Yevgeny Yevtushenko (close friend of Tselkov), Louis Aragon, and Pablo Neruda.

The first Tselkov solo exhibition was opened in Kurchatov Institute in January 1966, but after two days it was closed by the KGB for being ideologically unacceptable. In 1977 Tselkov moved to Paris. Some time later, he bought a farm in the Champagne region of France to Osne-le-val, 300 km from Paris. There he equipped a two-floor studio where he lived and worked.

== Bibliography ==
- Sapguir, Kira (2010). Squaring the circle : Vladimir Yankilevsky, Oscar Rabin, Oleg Tselkov, Dmitry Krasnopevtsev : Aktis gallery, London (in English and Russian). Paris: Somogy Art Publishers. p. 94 : ill. ISBN 9782757204375.
- Rzhevsky, Nicholas (2012) [1998]. The Cambridge Companion to Modern Russian Culture (2nd ed.). New York: Cambridge University Press. p. 436; 17 b/w il.,1 table. ISBN 9780521175586.
- Baigell, Matthew (1995). Soviet Dissident Artists: Interviews after Perestroika. New Brunswick, N.J.: Rutgers University Press. pp. 162–170.
- Aleksandr Kamensky / Каменский, Александр Абрамович (1992). Олег Целков / Oleg Tselkov (in Russian, French, and English). Paris—Moscow—New York: The Third Wave, Ostankino. p. 199, ил.
- Другое искусство: Москва 1956—1976. В двух томах (in Russian). Vol. 1, 2. Moscow: Художественная галерея «Московская коллекция», СП «Интербук». 1991. pp. 19, 23, 24, 36, 38, 55, 83, 126, 129, 138, 173, 181, 182, 194, 223, 225, 228, 234, 242, 247, 249, 251, 253, 256, 259, 320, 329 (I), 9, 181–183 (II).
- Art of Russia and the West, Nº 1. New York — Torino, Italy: Apollon Foundation. 1989. pp. 116, 72 color. pp. 50–59
- The Exhibition of three : Mikhail Shemi︠a︡kin, Oleg Tselkov, Ėrnst Neizvestnyĭ. «Nakhamkin Fine Arts» Gallery. 1979. pp. 88, 3 color il.
- Bosquet, Alain (1988). Oleg Tselkov (in Italian) (1st ed.). Milano: Fabbri. p. 299 : ill. en coul.
