= Slepian's lemma =

In probability theory, Slepian's lemma (1962), named after David Slepian, is a Gaussian comparison inequality. It states that for Gaussian random variables $X = (X_1,\dots,X_n)$ and $Y = (Y_1,\dots,Y_n)$ in $\mathbb{R}^n$ satisfying $\operatorname E[X] = \operatorname E[Y] = 0$,

$$\operatorname E[X_i^2]= \operatorname E[Y_i^2], \quad i=1,\dots,n, \text{ and } \operatorname E[X_iX_j] \le \operatorname E[Y_i Y_j] \text{ for } i \neq j.$$

the following inequality holds for all real numbers $u_1,\ldots,u_n$:

$$\Pr\left[\bigcap_{i=1}^n \{X_i \le u_i\}\right] \le \Pr\left[\bigcap_{i=1}^n \{Y_i \le u_i\}\right],$$

or equivalently,

$$\Pr\left[\bigcup_{i=1}^n \{X_i > u_i\}\right] \ge \Pr\left[\bigcup_{i=1}^n \{Y_i > u_i\}\right].$$

While this intuitive-seeming result is true for Gaussian processes, it is not in general true for other random variables—not even those with expectation 0.

As a corollary, if $(X_t)_{t \ge 0}$ is a centered stationary Gaussian process such that $\operatorname E[X_0 X_t] \geq 0$ for all $t$, it holds for any real number $c$ that

$$\Pr\left[\sup_{t \in [0,T+S]} X_t \leq c\right] \ge \Pr\left[\sup_{t \in [0,T]} X_t \leq c\right] \Pr \left[\sup_{t \in [0,S]} X_t \leq c\right], \quad T,S > 0.$$

== History ==
Slepian's lemma was first proven by Slepian in 1962, and has since been used in reliability theory, extreme value theory and areas of pure probability. It has also been re-proven in several different forms.
