= Jan Slepian =

American writer

- Born: Janice Berek; January 2, 1921; New York City, New York
- Died: November 2, 2016 (aged 95); Arlington, Massachusetts
- Education: Brooklyn College; University of Washington
- Occupations: author, speech therapist
- Spouse: David Slepian

Janice Slepian (née Berek; January 2, 1921 – November 2, 2016), was an author of books for children and young adults and a poet. She obtained a degree in psychology at Brooklyn College, later doing graduate work in clinical psychology and speech pathology at the University of Washington in Seattle. She worked as a speech therapist at Massachusetts General Hospital in Boston and then embarked on a writing career.

== Career ==
With co-author Ann Seidler, she published several illustrated books in a series called "The Listen-Hear Books". Titles included The Hungry Thing, The Hungry Thing Returns and The Hungry Thing Goes to a Restaurant: all three are for young readers and teach about phonemic awareness; they also co-authored The Cat Who Wore a Pot on Her Head, "Bendemolena," Alfie and the Dream Machine and several other titles.

Some of her books deal with mental disability, including The Alfred Summer (1980) Lester's Turn (1981) (both of which feature the voice of a child afflicted by cerebral palsy) and Risk n' Roses (1990).

Books for adolescent readers include The Night of the Bozos (1983), The Broccoli Tapes (1989), Pinocchio's Sister (1995), Mind Reader (1997) and Emily Just in Time (1998).

Her husband was the noted mathematician David Slepian.

Her 2009 book, Astonishment: Life in the slow lane (ISBN 0-557-04914-8), self-published when she was 88, is a collection of twenty brief essays on aging and life in a retirement community. In 2010, Laura Ekstrand, artistic director of Dreamcatcher Repertory Theater in South Orange, adapted the work into a stage production which was subsequently performed at various venues in New Jersey. In 2012, Slepian published a follow-up to Astonishment called How to Be Old.

Slepian began writing poetry at age 91, and published her first volume, Jellybeans in Space, in 2016, and her second, The Other Shoe, shortly before her death. She died on November 2, 2016.

== Books ==
- The Roaring Dragon of Redrose (1964) (with Ann Seidler), (The Listen-hear books)
- Magic Arthur and The Giant (1964) (with Ann Seidler), (The Listen-hear books)
- Mr. Sipple and the Naughty Princess (1964) (with Ann Seidler), (The Listen-hear books)
- Alfie and the Dream Machine (1964) (with Ann Seidler), (The Listen-hear books)
- Magic Arthur and The Giant (1964) (with Ann Seidler), (The Listen-hear books)
- Lester and the Sea Monster (1964) (with Ann Seidler), (The Listen-hear books)
- The Hungry Thing (1967) (with Ann Seidler)
- Bendemolena (1967) (with Ann Seidler)
- Cat Who Wore a Pot on Her Head (1980) (with Ann Seidler)
- The Alfred Summer (1981)
- Lester's Turn (1981)
- The Night of the Bozos (1983)
- Getting on with It (1985)
- Something Beyond Paradise (1987)
- Emily Just in Time (1987)
- The Broccoli Tapes (1989)
- Risk N' Roses (1991)
- Back to Before (1993)
- The Hungry Thing Returns (1993) (with Ann Seidler)
- The Hungry Thing Goes to a Restaurant (1993) (with Ann Seidler)
- Lost Moose (1995)
- Pinocchio's Sister (1995)
- The Mind Reader (1997)
- Astonishment: Life in the Slow Lane (2008)
- How to Be Old: A Beginner's Guide (2012)
- Jellybeans in Space (2015)
- The Other Shoe (2016)

== Awards and recognition ==
- The Alfred Summer was included on a list of the One Hundred Books that Shaped the Century by the School Library Journal (2000). It was also nominated for American Book Award and was on the honor roll of the Boston Globe-Horn Book Award (1980).
