= David Slepian =

American mathematician (1923–2007)

- Born: June 30, 1923; Pittsburgh, Pennsylvania
- Died: November 29, 2007 (aged 84)
- Education: Harvard University; University of Michigan
- Known for: Slepian sequences Slepian's lemma Slepian–Wolf coding
- Spouse: Jan Slepian
- Awards: IEEE Centennial Medal (1984); John von Neumann Prize (1982); IEEE Alexander Graham Bell Medal (1981); Claude E. Shannon Award (1974)
- Scientific career
- Fields: Mathematics
- Workplaces: Bell Telephone Laboratories
- Thesis: (1949)

David S. Slepian (June 30, 1923 – November 29, 2007) was an American mathematician. He is best known for his work with algebraic coding theory, probability theory, and distributed source coding. He was colleagues with Claude Shannon and Richard Hamming at Bell Labs.

== Life and work ==
Born in Pittsburgh, Pennsylvania, he gained a B.Sc. at University of Michigan before joining the US Army in World War II, as a sonic deception officer in the 3133rd Signal Service Company of the Ghost Army.

He received his Ph.D. from Harvard University in 1949, writing his dissertation in physics. After post-doctoral work at the University of Cambridge and University of Sorbonne, he worked at the Mathematics Research Center at Bell Telephone Laboratories, where he pioneered work in algebraic coding theory on group codes, first published in the paper A Class of Binary Signaling Alphabets. Here, he also worked along with other information theory giants such as Claude Shannon and Richard Hamming. He also proved the possibility of singular detection, a perhaps unintuitive result. He is also known for Slepian's lemma in probability theory (1962), and for discovering a fundamental result in distributed source coding called Slepian–Wolf coding with Jack Keil Wolf (1973).

He later joined the University of Hawaiʻi. His father was Joseph Slepian, also a scientist. His wife is the noted children's author Jan Slepian.

== Slepian Functions ==
Three examples of Slepian functions, named after David Slepian.

Slepian's joint work with H.J. Landau and H.O. Pollak on discrete prolate spheroidal wave functions and sequences (DPSWF, DPSS) eventually led to the naming of the sequences as Slepian functions or "Slepians". The naming suggestion was provided by Bob Parker of Scripp's Institute of Oceanography, who suggested that "discrete prolate spheroidal sequences" was a "mouthful". The term "prolates" is equally in current use.

This work was fundamental to the development of the method of multitaper spectral analysis, where the discrete Slepian functions are used as an essential component to provide bias control while reducing estimation variance.

== Awards ==
- IEEE Fellow
- Fellow of Institute of Mathematical Statistics
- Claude E. Shannon Award from the IEEE Information Theory Group 1974, and due to this also the Shannon Lecturer 1974.
- National Academy of Engineering elected member 1976
- National Academy of Sciences elected member 1977
- IEEE Alexander Graham Bell Medal 1981
- IEEE Centennial Medal 1984
- Society for Industrial and Applied Mathematics’s John von Neumann lecture award 1982
- American Academy of Arts and Sciences elected member

Awards
Preceded by Richard R. Hough	IEEE Alexander Graham Bell Medal; 1981	Succeeded by Harold Rosen
