= Mikhail German =

Mikhail Yurievich German
- Born: 23 February 1933; Leningrad, Soviet Union
- Died: 7 May 2018 (aged 85); St. Petersburg, Russia
- Resting place: Smolensky Cemetery, St. Petersburg
- Occupations: Writer, Art Historian
- Writing career
- Language: Russian, French, English
- Years active: 1959 - 2018
- Genres: scientific monograph, essays, prose

Mikhail Yurievich German (Russian: Михаи́л Ю́рьевич Ге́рман; 23 February 1933 – 7 May 2018) was a Russian art historian, active in St. Petersburg. The elder son to novelist Yuri German and half-brother to filmmaker Aleksei German, he was known for monographs on Western painting.

== Awards ==
- Tsarskoselskaya art award (2007)
- Prize "Nevsky Prospekt"
- Prize of the Government of St. Petersburg in the category of "prose" for the book "The Elusive Paris".

== Bibliography ==
=== Selected books ===
Mikhail Herman is the author of over 50 books and numerous publications in print media devoted to the problems of the history and contemporary development of art.

- Podlaski (1959)
- Daumier, Honore (1962)
- David (1964)
- On Seven Hills (1965)
- Hogarth (1971)
- Leonid Semyonovich Khizhinsky (1972)
- Antwerp. Gent. Brugge (1974)
- William Hogarth and his time (1977)
- Antoine Watteau (1980)
- The Universe of the Painter (1982)

=== Articles ===
- Georgy Kovenchuk (Exhibition catalog. "Matisse Club"). — St. Petersburg: Mathis Club. 2005. — 32 p. [without pagination]. (Rus).
