= Joseph Slepian =

American mathematician

- Born: 11 February 1891; Boston, MA
- Died: 19 December 1969 (aged 78)
- Education: Harvard University (B.Sc.) (1911); Harvard University (M.Sc.) (1912); Harvard University (Ph.D.) (1913)
- Awards: IEEE Edison Medal (1947)
- Scientific career
- Workplaces: Cornell University

Joseph Slepian (February 11, 1891 – December 19, 1969) was an American electrical engineer known for his contributions to the developments of electrical apparatus and theory.

Born in Boston, MA of Russian immigrants, he studied mathematics at Harvard University, from which he was awarded a B.Sc. (1911), an M.Sc. (1912) and Ph.D. on the thesis On the Functions of a Complex Variable Defined by an Ordinary Differential Equation of the First Order and First Degree advised by George Birkhoff (1913). Meanwhile, he also worked at Boston Elevated Railway.

After his Ph.D., he became Sheldon fellow at University of Göttingen in Germany, was at University of Sorbonne in Paris, before becoming instructor of mathematics at Cornell University (1915). He joined Westinghouse Electric in East Pittsburgh (1916) in the railway motor department initially, moving to the research department (1917) at Forest Hills (PA) where he became head (1922), consulting engineer (1926) and associate director (1938–1956) and developed over two hundred patents. Slepian did significant groundwork for the betatron (1927). He received the IEEE Edison Medal (1947) for his work on the autovalve lightning arrester, deion circuit breaker, and ignitron.

He wrote over 120 articles and essays, and published the book Conductivity of electricity in gases (1933). His career was somewhat shortened by a stroke (1951). He was the father of the mathematician David Slepian.

== Awards ==
- Fellow of AIEE 1927
- John Scott Medal 1932
- AIEE Lamme Medal 1942
- Westinghouse Order of Merit 1935
- French Officer de Academie 1939
- National Academy of Sciences elected member 1941
- Fellow of the Institute of Radio Engineers 1945
- IEEE Edison Medal 1947
- Honorary doctor of engineering Case Institute of Technology 1949
- Honorary doctor of science by the University of Leeds 1955
