= Robert Rey (art historian) =

Robert Rey, born Robert Victor Charles Maurice Herfray (24 January 1888, Oran - 22 December 1964, Paris) was a French art historian and critic.

== Biography ==
His father, Victor (1853-1935), was a colonial administrator. During his childhood and youth, Robert lived in New Caledonia, Senegal, and French Guiana. He was a graduate of the École du Louvre.

In 1911, after working as a secretary for Georges Courteline, he was chosen to be Secretary of the Musée de Cluny. Three years later, even though he had completed his military service, he joined his father on the front lines, as an artillery gunner, and came back with two merit citations.

After the war, he was appointed Secretary of his alma mater, and held that position until 1925, when he was named Assistant Curator at the Musée du Luxembourg. He would, however, continue at the École as a teacher for another twenty-one years. Later that same year, he was named a Knight in the Legion of Honor. In 1930, he became Conservator for the museum at the Château de Fontainebleau.

Another appointment came in 1936, when he was named "Inspecteur Général des Beaux-Arts. In 1940, the Vichy government relieved him of his administrative duties, and he became a conservator at the Louvre, where he was placed in charge of reorganizing the provincial museums. His frequent travels enabled him to transmit information to the Resistance. After the war, he was presented with the Croix de Guerre, and was named Director of the visual arts division at the General Directorate of Arts and Letters.

From 1949, when he retired, until 1960, he occupied the chair of art history at the École des Beaux-Arts. Shortly before his death, he was elected to the Académie des Beaux-Arts, taking Seat #1 in the "Unattached" section.
