= Donald Posner =

American author (1931–2005)

- Born: August 30, 1931; The Bronx, New York, U.S.
- Died: August 13, 2005 (aged 73); Manhattan, New York, U.S.

Donald Posner (1931–2005) was an American Baroque art historian and author. He was a professor of fine arts at the New York University Institute of Fine Arts. He was born in the Bronx on August 30, 1931. He received his B.A. from Queens College in 1957. He served as a radar specialist with the Air Force in the Korean War before 1957. In 1957, he earned a master's from Harvard University. He pursued doctoral studies in Baroque art with Walter Friedlaender.

== Bibliography ==
- 17th and 18th Century Art, Baroque Painting, Sculpture, Architecture (1972)
- Watteau: A Lady at Her Toilet (1973)
- Annibale Carracci: A Study in the Reform of Italian Painting around 1590 (1971)
