= Vladimir Slepian =

Vladimir Slepian, a.k.a. Eric Pid (Russian: Владимир Слепян / Эрик Пид; 1930 – 7 July 1998) was a French artist and writer of Russian-Jewish origin.

== Biography ==
Son of a repressed and executed Soviet functionary, Vladimir Slepian was born in Prague and resided in Leningrad before moving to Moscow. He began his university studies in mathematics, continuing as a student of fine art. In 1956 Slepian moved to Moscow. He attended the Picasso exhibition at the Pushkin Museum and presented his paintings to David Burliuk, who was then staying at Hotel Moskva. Burliuk inspired Slepian to look towards the way Jackson Pollock deposited paint on canvas with broad, lunging, spontaneous gestures. Slepian's style evolved towards happening and performance art. He devoted several years to action painting. On one occasion, Slepian conducted a séance of simultaneous painting in collaboration with Yuri Zlotnikov. They suspended a bedsheet in the middle of a room and each of them painted one side of it whilst following the actions of his partner on the other side through the translucent fabric. Slepian created abstract paintings using a gas torch and paint dispensed out of a pump. He is said to have worked on a canvas a few kilometers long, by pouring paint on it from a truck. Slepian also made a pilgrimage to Nazım Hikmet, who assured him and his friends that modern art will prevail over political oppression. In 1957 Paris' Right Bank Galerie Daniel Cordier mounted an anonymous exhibition of paintings by Vladimir Slepian, smuggled out of Moscow by its owner.

Vladimir Slepian emigrated to France in 1958, by way of Poland. In 1960 he conducted a performance of “transfinite painting” ("трансфинитная живопись") in Paris. Slepian sprinted along a roll of paper a hundred meters long, depositing paint in a manner that recalled calligraphy. Slepian competed with Georges Mathieu, by creating a picture in ninety seconds. He is said to have turned a road into an action painting by throwing paint onto it whilst riding a motorcycle. In 1963, Slepian gave up painting, resolving to concentrate on writing. He founded a successful translation bureau, explaining his ambition as using his intelligence to put others to work for his benefit, whilst enjoying idleness. His business operated successfully until its manager quit in a protest against Slepian's despotism.

In his only published French text, a short story titled Fils de chien, Vladimir Slepian writes of a man who decides to become a dog. He transforms himself one limb and one organ at a time, mapping the effects of the canine body across a human form in a kind of diagramming. Since dogs are quadrupeds, he ties shoes to his hands and feet. When his paws prevent him from lacing the fourth shoe, he uses his mouth, which becomes a dog's snout. This metamorphosis almost succeeds, until the hero comes to the dog's tail, for which he can find no analogue among human limbs. For him to involve his sexual organ in this transmogrification would tear him away from the society that he has begun to flee. Who would he be, if his identity could not be inferred from his anatomy? The story ends with a descent into childhood memories of the protagonist's mother. It appeared in n° 7 of the Revue Minuit alongside texts by Samuel Beckett, Robert Pinget, and Alain Robbe-Grillet. It served as inspiration for discussion by Gilles Deleuze and Félix Guattari in A Thousand Plateaus.

Several years later, Vladimir Slepian renamed himself Eric Pid. He explained his new French name as an anagram of the blind king Oedipus, alluding to blindness at the etymological origins of his Russian family name. In his later years, Slepian succeeded at having his dramatic text staged as an interpolation in A quand Agamemnon ?, an adaptation of Aeschylus’ Agamemnon by Philippe Brunet and Demodocos, a band of young artists specialized in classical theatre, performed in French, Latin and/or ancient Greek. He went around Paris, distributing framed photographs of this performance for wall display at restaurants. On 7 July 1998, Slepian collapsed on a sidewalk at Saint-Germain des Prés. The cause of his death is variously reported as hunger and a cardiac crisis. He was buried as an indigent, at the state's expense.

Vladimir Slepian's life served as inspiration for Viktor Atemian, the protagonist of 2007 feature film L’Homme qui marche by Aurélia Georges.
