= Timeline of information theory =

A timeline of events related to information theory, quantum information theory and statistical physics, data compression, error correcting codes and related subjects.

- 1872 – Ludwig Boltzmann presents his H-theorem, and with it the formula Σp_{i} log p_{i} for the entropy of a single gas particle
- 1878 – J. Willard Gibbs defines the Gibbs entropy: the probabilities in the entropy formula are now taken as probabilities of the state of the whole system
- 1924 – Harry Nyquist discusses quantifying "intelligence" and the speed at which it can be transmitted by a communication system
- 1927 – John von Neumann defines the von Neumann entropy, extending the Gibbs entropy to quantum mechanics
- 1928 – Ralph Hartley introduces Hartley information as the logarithm of the number of possible messages, with information being communicated when the receiver can distinguish one sequence of symbols from any other (regardless of any associated meaning)
- 1929 – Leó Szilárd analyses Maxwell's demon, showing how a Szilard engine can sometimes transform information into the extraction of useful work
- 1940 – Alan Turing introduces the deciban as a measure of information inferred about the German Enigma machine cypher settings by the Banburismus process
- 1944 – Claude Shannon's theory of information is substantially complete
- 1947 – Richard W. Hamming invents Hamming codes for error detection and correction (to protect patent rights, the result is not published until 1950)
- 1948 – Claude E. Shannon publishes A Mathematical Theory of Communication
- 1949 – Claude E. Shannon publishes Communication in the Presence of Noise – Nyquist–Shannon sampling theorem and Shannon–Hartley law
- 1949 – Claude E. Shannon's Communication Theory of Secrecy Systems is declassified
- 1949 – Robert M. Fano publishes Transmission of Information. M.I.T. Press, Cambridge, Massachusetts – Shannon–Fano coding
- 1949 – Leon G. Kraft discovers Kraft's inequality, which shows the limits of prefix codes
- 1949 – Marcel J. E. Golay introduces Golay codes for forward error correction
- 1950 – Richard Hamming publishes Hamming code paper, creates a new field of study Coding theory
- 1951 – Solomon Kullback and Richard Leibler introduce the Kullback–Leibler divergence
- 1951 – David A. Huffman invents Huffman encoding, a method of finding optimal prefix codes for lossless data compression
- 1953 – August Albert Sardinas and George W. Patterson devise the Sardinas–Patterson algorithm, a procedure to decide whether a given variable-length code is uniquely decodable
- 1954 – Irving S. Reed and David E. Muller propose Reed–Muller codes
- 1955 – Peter Elias introduces convolutional codes
- 1957 – Eugene Prange first discusses cyclic codes
- 1959 – Alexis Hocquenghem, and independently the next year Raj Chandra Bose and Dwijendra Kumar Ray-Chaudhuri, discover BCH codes
- 1960 – Irving S. Reed and Gustave Solomon propose Reed–Solomon codes
- 1962 – Robert G. Gallager proposes low-density parity-check codes; they are unused for 30 years due to technical limitations
- 1965 – Dave Forney discusses concatenated codes
- 1966 – Fumitada Itakura (Nagoya University) and Shuzo Saito (Nippon Telegraph and Telephone) develop linear predictive coding (LPC), a form of speech coding
- 1967 – Andrew Viterbi reveals the Viterbi algorithm, making decoding of convolutional codes practicable
- 1968 – Elwyn Berlekamp invents the Berlekamp–Massey algorithm; its application to decoding BCH and Reed–Solomon codes is pointed out by James L. Massey the following year
- 1968 – Chris Wallace and David M. Boulton publish the first of many papers on Minimum Message Length (MML) statistical and inductive inference
- 1970 – Valerii Denisovich Goppa introduces Goppa codes
- 1972 – Jørn Justesen proposes Justesen codes, an improvement of Reed–Solomon codes
- 1972 – Nasir Ahmed proposes the discrete cosine transform (DCT), which he develops with T. Natarajan and K. R. Rao in 1973; the DCT later became the most widely used lossy compression algorithm, the basis for multimedia formats such as JPEG, MPEG and MP3
- 1973 – David Slepian and Jack Wolf discover and prove the Slepian–Wolf coding limits for distributed source coding
- 1976 – Gottfried Ungerboeck gives the first paper on trellis modulation; a more detailed exposition in 1982 leads to a raising of analogue modem POTS speeds from 9.6 kbit/s to 33.6 kbit/s
- 1976 – Richard Pasco and Jorma J. Rissanen develop effective arithmetic coding techniques
- 1977 – Abraham Lempel and Jacob Ziv develop Lempel–Ziv compression (LZ77)
- 1982 – Valerii Denisovich Goppa introduces algebraic geometry codes
- 1989 – Phil Katz publishes the .zip format including DEFLATE (LZ77 + Huffman coding); later to become the most widely used archive container
- 1993 – Claude Berrou, Alain Glavieux and Punya Thitimajshima introduce Turbo codes
- 1994 – Michael Burrows and David Wheeler publish the Burrows–Wheeler transform, later to find use in bzip2
- 1995 – Benjamin Schumacher coins the term qubit and proves the quantum noiseless coding theorem
- 2003 – David J. C. MacKay shows the connection between information theory, inference and machine learning in his book.
- 2006 – Jarosław Duda introduces first Asymmetric numeral systems entropy coding: since 2014 popular replacement of Huffman and arithmetic coding in compressors like Facebook Zstandard, Apple LZFSE, CRAM or JPEG XL
- 2008 – Erdal Arıkan introduces polar codes, the first practical construction of codes that achieves capacity for a wide array of channels
