= Small-bias sample space =

In theoretical computer science, a small-bias sample space (also known as $\epsilon$-biased sample space, $\epsilon$-biased generator, or small-bias probability space) is a probability distribution that fools parity functions. In other words, no parity function can distinguish between a small-bias sample space and the uniform distribution with high probability, and hence, small-bias sample spaces naturally give rise to pseudorandom generators for parity functions.

The main useful property of small-bias sample spaces is that they need far fewer truly random bits than the uniform distribution to fool parities. Efficient constructions of small-bias sample spaces have found many applications in computer science, some of which are derandomization, error-correcting codes, and probabilistically checkable proofs. The connection with error-correcting codes is in fact very strong since $\epsilon$-biased sample spaces are equivalent to $\epsilon$-balanced error-correcting codes.

== Definition ==
=== Bias ===
Let $X$ be a probability distribution over $\{0,1\}^n$. The bias of $X$ with respect to a set of indices $I \subseteq \{1,\dots,n\}$ is defined as

$$\text{bias}_I(X)
=
\left|
\Pr_{x\sim X} \left(\sum_{i\in I} x_i = 0\right)
-
\Pr_{x\sim X} \left(\sum_{i\in I} x_i = 1\right)
\right|
=
\left|
2 \cdot \Pr_{x\sim X} \left(\sum_{i\in I} x_i = 0\right)
-1
\right|
\,,$$

where the sum is taken over $\mathbb F_2$, the finite field with two elements. In other words, the sum $\sum_{i\in I} x_i$ equals $0$ if the number of ones in the sample $x\in\{0,1\}^n$ at the positions defined by $I$ is even, and otherwise, the sum equals $1$. For $I=\emptyset$, the empty sum is defined to be zero, and hence $\text{bias}_{\emptyset} (X) = 1$.

=== ϵ-biased sample space ===
A probability distribution $X$ over $\{0,1\}^n$ is called an $\epsilon$-biased sample space if $\text{bias}_I(X) \leq \epsilon$ holds for all non-empty subsets $I \subseteq \{1,2,\ldots,n\}$.

=== ϵ-biased set ===
An $\epsilon$-biased sample space $X$ that is generated by picking a uniform element from a multiset $X\subseteq \{0,1\}^n$ is called $\epsilon$-biased set. The size $s$ of an $\epsilon$-biased set $X$ is the size of the multiset that generates the sample space.

=== ϵ-biased generator ===
An $\epsilon$-biased generator $G:\{0,1\}^\ell \to \{0,1\}^n$ is a function that maps strings of length $\ell$ to strings of length $n$ such that the multiset $X_G=\{G(y) \;\vert\; y\in\{0,1\}^\ell \}$ is an $\epsilon$-biased set. The seed length of the generator is the number $\ell$ and is related to the size of the $\epsilon$-biased set $X_G$ via the equation $s=2^\ell$.

== Connection with epsilon-balanced error-correcting codes ==
There is a close connection between $\epsilon$-biased sets and $\epsilon$-balanced linear error-correcting codes. A linear code $C:\{0,1\}^n\to\{0,1\}^s$ of message length $n$ and block length $s$ is $\epsilon$-balanced if the Hamming weight of every nonzero codeword $C(x)$ is between $(\frac{1}{2}-\epsilon)s$ and $(\frac{1}{2}+\epsilon)s$. Since $C$ is a linear code, its generator matrix is an $(n\times s)$-matrix $A$ over $\mathbb F_2$ with $C(x)=x \cdot A$.

Then it holds that a multiset $X\subset\{0,1\}^{n}$ is $\epsilon$-biased if and only if the linear code $C_X$, whose columns are exactly elements of $X$, is $\epsilon$-balanced.

== Constructions of small epsilon-biased sets ==
Usually the goal is to find $\epsilon$-biased sets that have a small size $s$ relative to the parameters $n$ and $\epsilon$. This is because a smaller size $s$ means that the amount of randomness needed to pick a random element from the set is smaller, and so the set can be used to fool parities using few random bits.

=== Theoretical bounds ===
The probabilistic method gives a non-explicit construction that achieves size $s=O(n/\epsilon^2)$. The construction is non-explicit in the sense that finding the $\epsilon$-biased set requires a lot of true randomness, which does not help towards the goal of reducing the overall randomness. However, this non-explicit construction is useful because it shows that these efficient codes exist. On the other hand, the best known lower bound for the size of $\epsilon$-biased sets is $s=\Omega(n/ (\epsilon^2 \log (1/\epsilon))$, that is, in order for a set to be $\epsilon$-biased, it must be at least that big.

=== Explicit constructions ===
There are many explicit, i.e., deterministic constructions of $\epsilon$-biased sets with various parameter settings:

- Naor & Naor (1990) achieve $\displaystyle s= \frac{n}{\text{poly}(\epsilon)}$. The construction makes use of Justesen codes (which is a concatenation of Reed–Solomon codes with the Wozencraft ensemble) as well as expander walk sampling.
- Alon et al. (1992) achieve $\displaystyle s= O\left(\frac{n}{\epsilon \log (n/\epsilon)}\right)^2$. One of their constructions is the concatenation of Reed–Solomon codes with the Hadamard code; this concatenation turns out to be an $\epsilon$-balanced code, which gives rise to an $\epsilon$-biased sample space via the connection mentioned above.
- Concatenating Algebraic geometric codes with the Hadamard code gives an $\epsilon$-balanced code with $\displaystyle s= O\left(\frac{n}{\epsilon^3 \log (1/\epsilon)}\right)$.
- Ben-Aroya & Ta-Shma (2009) achieves $\displaystyle s= O\left(\frac{n}{\epsilon^2 \log (1/\epsilon)}\right)^{5/4}$.
- Ta-Shma (2017) achieves $\displaystyle s= O\left(\frac{n}{\epsilon^{2+o(1)}}\right)$ which is almost optimal because of the lower bound.

These bounds are mutually incomparable. In particular, none of these constructions yields the smallest $\epsilon$-biased sets for all settings of $\epsilon$ and $n$.

== Application: almost k-wise independence ==
An important application of small-bias sets lies in the construction of almost k-wise independent sample spaces.

=== k-wise independent spaces ===
A random variable $Y$ over $\{0,1\}^n$ is a k-wise independent space if, for all index sets $I\subseteq\{1,\dots,n\}$ of size $k$, the marginal distribution $Y|_I$ is exactly equal to the uniform distribution over $\{0,1\}^k$. That is, for all such $I$ and all strings $z\in\{0,1\}^k$, the distribution $Y$ satisfies $\Pr_Y (Y|_I = z) = 2^{-k}$.

==== Constructions and bounds ====
k-wise independent spaces are fairly well understood.

- A simple construction by Joffe (1974) achieves size $n^k$.
- Alon, Babai & Itai (1986) construct a k-wise independent space whose size is $n^{k/2}$.
- Chor et al. (1985) prove that no k-wise independent space can be significantly smaller than $n^{k/2}$.

==== Joffe's construction ====
Joffe (1974) constructs a $k$-wise independent space $Y$ over the finite field with some prime number $n>k$ of elements, i.e., $Y$ is a distribution over $\mathbb F_n^n$. The initial $k$ marginals of the distribution are drawn independently and uniformly at random:

$$(Y_0,\dots,Y_{k-1}) \sim\mathbb F_n^k$$.

For each $i$ with $k \leq i < n$, the marginal distribution of $Y_i$ is then defined as

$$Y_i=Y_0 + Y_1 \cdot i + Y_2 \cdot i^2 + \dots + Y_{k-1} \cdot i^{k-1}\,,$$

where the calculation is done in $\mathbb F_n$. Joffe (1974) proves that the distribution $Y$ constructed in this way is $k$-wise independent as a distribution over $\mathbb F_n^n$. The distribution $Y$ is uniform on its support, and hence, the support of $Y$ forms a $k$-wise independent set. It contains all $n^k$ strings in $\mathbb F_n^k$ that have been extended to strings of length $n$ using the deterministic rule above.

=== Almost k-wise independent spaces ===
A random variable $Y$ over $\{0,1\}^n$ is a $\delta$-almost k-wise independent space if, for all index sets $I\subseteq\{1,\dots,n\}$ of size $k$, the restricted distribution $Y|_I$ and the uniform distribution $U_k$ on $\{0,1\}^k$ are $\delta$-close in 1-norm, i.e., $\Big\|Y|_I - U_k\Big\|_1 \leq \delta$.

==== Constructions ====
Naor & Naor (1990) give a general framework for combining small k-wise independent spaces with small $\epsilon$-biased spaces to obtain $\delta$-almost k-wise independent spaces of even smaller size. In particular, let $G_1:\{0,1\}^h\to\{0,1\}^n$ be a linear mapping that generates a k-wise independent space and let $G_2:\{0,1\}^\ell \to \{0,1\}^h$ be a generator of an $\epsilon$-biased set over $\{0,1\}^h$. That is, when given a uniformly random input, the output of $G_1$ is a k-wise independent space, and the output of $G_2$ is $\epsilon$-biased. Then $G : \{0,1\}^\ell \to \{0,1\}^n$ with $G(x) = G_1(G_2(x))$ is a generator of an $\delta$-almost $k$-wise independent space, where $\delta=2^{k/2} \epsilon$.

As mentioned above, Alon, Babai & Itai (1986) construct a generator $G_1$ with $h=\tfrac{k}{2} \log n$, and Naor & Naor (1990) construct a generator $G_2$ with $\ell=\log s=\log h + O(\log(\epsilon^{-1}))$. Hence, the concatenation $G$ of $G_1$ and $G_2$ has seed length $\ell = \log k + \log \log n + O(\log(\epsilon^{-1}))$. In order for $G$ to yield a $\delta$-almost k-wise independent space, we need to set $\epsilon = \delta 2^{-k/2}$, which leads to a seed length of $\ell = \log \log n + O(k+\log(\delta^{-1}))$ and a sample space of total size $2^\ell \leq \log n \cdot \text{poly}(2^k \cdot\delta^{-1})$.
