= Wozencraft =

Wozencraft is a surname. Notable people with this name include:

- Frank W. Wozencraft (1892–1966), American lawyer and former mayor of Dallas
- John Wozencraft (1925–2009), American electrical engineer and information theorist

- Wozencraft ensemble, set of codes whose existence was proved by John Wozencraft

- Kim Wozencraft (born 1954), American author
- O. M. Wozencraft (1814–1887), early American settler in California
- W. Chris Wozencraft (1954–2007), American zoologist
