= Jane Simmons =

American optical network researcher

Jane Marie Simmons (September 24, 1963 – August 25, 2021) was an American researcher in optical networks. She was the author of the book Optical Network Design and Planning (2008; 2nd ed., Springer, 2014).

== Education and career ==
Simmons was originally from Middletown Township, New Jersey, where she was born on September 24, 1963. As a high school student, she was recognized nationally in the Presidential Scholars Program. She majored in electrical engineering at Princeton University, graduating summa cum laude in 1985. After working for three years in the software industry, she continued her studies in electrical engineering at the Massachusetts Institute of Technology, receiving a master's degree in 1990 and completing her Ph.D. in 1993. Her doctoral dissertation, End-to-end reliable communication in data networks, was supervised by Robert G. Gallager.

She joined Bell Labs in the mid-1990s, and started her work on optical networks there. After leaving Bell Labs, she became chief network architect for the all-optical backbone network of the Corvis Corporation, and founded Monarch Network Architects in 2003.

She served as editor-in-chief of the Journal of Optical Communications and Networking from 2017 to her death in 2021.

== Recognition ==
Simmons was named as an IEEE Fellow in 2011, "for contributions to optical network architecture and algorithms".

Optica established the Jane M. Simmons Memorial Speakership, an award supporting an invited speaker at the annual Optical Fiber Communication Conference, in memory of Simmons in 2021.
