= Robert G. Gallager =

American electrical engineer (born 1931)

Robert Gray Gallager
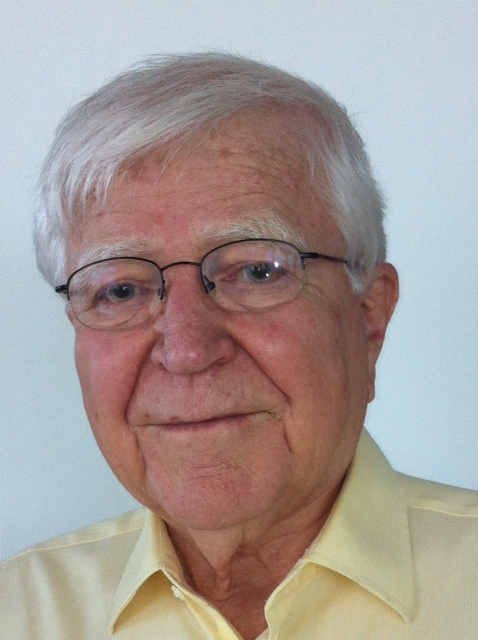
- Born: May 29, 1931 (age 95); Philadelphia, Pennsylvania
- Education: University of Pennsylvania; MIT
- Awards: Claude E. Shannon Award (1983); IEEE Centennial Medal (1984); IEEE Medal of Honor (1990); Harvey Prize (1999); Marconi Prize (2003); Dijkstra Prize (2004); Japan Prize (2020)
- Scientific career
- Fields: Information theory
- Doctoral advisor: Peter Elias
- Doctoral students: Erdal Arıkan; Elwyn Berlekamp; Muriel Médard; Jim Roskind; Jane Simmons; David Tse

Robert Gray Gallager (born May 29, 1931) is an American electrical engineer known for his work on information theory and communications networks.

Gallager was elected a member of the National Academy of Engineering (NAE) in 1979 for contributions to coding and communications theory and practice. He was also elected an IEEE Fellow in 1968, a member of the National Academy of Sciences (NAS) in 1992, and a Fellow of the American Academy of Arts and Sciences (AAAS) in 1999.

He received the Claude E. Shannon Award from the IEEE Information Theory Society in 1983. He also received the IEEE Centennial Medal in 1984, the IEEE Medal of Honor in 1990 "For fundamental contributions to communications coding techniques", the Marconi Prize in 2003, and a Dijkstra Prize in 2004, among other honors. For most of his career he was a professor of electrical engineering and computer science at the Massachusetts Institute of Technology.

== Biography ==
Gallager received the B.S.E.E. degree from the University of Pennsylvania in 1953. He was a member of the technical staff at the Bell Telephone Laboratories in 1953–1954 and then served in the U.S. Signal Corps 1954–1956. He returned to graduate school at the Massachusetts Institute of Technology (MIT), and received the S.M. degree in 1957 and Sc.D. in 1960 in electrical engineering. He has been a faculty member at MIT since 1960 where he was co-director of the Laboratory for Information and Decision Systems from 1986 to 1998, was named Fujitsu Professor in 1988, and became Professor Emeritus in 2001. He is a principal investigator in the Research Laboratory of Electronics. He was a visiting associate professor at the University of California, Berkeley, in 1965 and a visiting professor at the École Nationale Supérieure des Télécommunications, Paris, in 1978.

Gallager's 1960 Sc.D. thesis, on low-density parity-check codes, was published by the MIT Press as a monograph in 1963. The codes, which remained useful over 50 years, are sometimes called "Gallager codes". An abbreviated version appeared in January 1962 in the IRE Transactions on Information Theory and was republished in the 1974 IEEE Press volume, Key Papers in The Development of Information Theory, edited by Elwyn Berlekamp. This paper won an IEEE Information Theory Society Golden-Jubilee Paper Award in 1998 and its subject matter is a very active area of research today. Gallager's January 1965 paper in the IEEE Transactions on Information Theory, "A Simple Derivation of the Coding Theorem and some Applications", won the 1966 IEEE W.R.G. Baker Award "for the most outstanding paper, reporting original work, in the Transactions, Journals and Magazines of the IEEE Societies, or in the Proceedings of the IEEE" and also won another IEEE Information Theory Society Golden-Jubilee Paper Award in 1998. His book, Information Theory and Reliable Communication, Wiley 1968, placed Information Theory on a sound mathematical foundation and is still considered by many as the standard textbook on information theory.

Gallager consulted for Melpar as a graduate student, and for Codex Corporation when it was founded in 1962. He served Codex as acting vice president for research in 1971–1972. His work (along with fellow-MIT faculty member Dave Forney) on quadrature amplitude modulation led to the 9600 bit/s modems that provided Codex's commercial success. He has also consulted for the MIT Lincoln Laboratory and a number of other companies. He has been granted five patents on his inventions.

In the mid-1970s, Gallager's research focus shifted to data networks, focusing on distributed algorithms, routing, congestion control, and random access techniques. In 1978, he showed, with graduate student Roger Camrass, that packet switching was optimal in the Huffman coding sense. He published a book Data Networks in 1988, with a second edition 1992, co-authored with Dimitri Bertsekas, which helped provide a conceptual foundation for this field.

In the 1990s, Gallager's interests shifted back to information theory and to stochastic processes. He wrote the 1996 textbook, Discrete Stochastic Processes. Gallager's current interests are in information theory, wireless communication, all optical networks, data networks, and stochastic processes.

Over the years, Gallager has taught and mentored many graduate students, many of whom are now themselves leading researchers in their fields. He received the MIT Graduate Student Council Teaching Award for 1993. In 1999 he received the Harvey Prize from the American Society for the Technion – Israel Institute of Technology. In 2020 he was awarded the Japan Prize.

Gallager's textbook, Principles of Digital Communication was published by Cambridge University Press in 2008.

Gallager was President of the IEEE Information Theory Society in 1971, a member of its board of governors from 1965 to 1972 and again from 1979 to 1988. He served the IEEE Transactions on Information Theory as associate editor for coding 1963–1964 and as associate editor for computer communications from 1977 to 1980. He was chairman of the advisory committee to the National Science Foundation Division on Networking and Communication Research and Infrastructure from 1989 to 1992, and has been on numerous visiting committees for electrical engineering and computer science departments.

== Personal life ==
Gallager has 3 children, 4 stepchildren, 7 grandchildren, 10 step grandchildren and 3 great step children. He is married to Marie Gallager.
