= Sardinas–Patterson algorithm =

In coding theory, the Sardinas–Patterson algorithm is a classical algorithm for determining in polynomial time whether a given variable-length code is uniquely decodable, named after August Albert Sardinas and George W. Patterson, who published it in 1953. The algorithm carries out a systematic search for a string which admits two different decompositions into codewords. As Knuth reports, the algorithm was rediscovered about ten years later in 1963 by Floyd, despite the fact that it was at the time already well known in coding theory.

== Idea of the algorithm ==
Consider the code $\{\, \texttt{a} \mapsto \texttt{1}, \texttt{b} \mapsto \texttt{011}, \texttt{c}\mapsto \texttt{01110}, \texttt{d}\mapsto \texttt{1110}, \texttt{e}\mapsto \texttt{10011}\,\}$. This code, which is based on an example by Berstel, is an example of a code which is not uniquely decodable, since the string

011101110011

can be interpreted as the sequence of codewords

01110 – 1110 – 011,

but also as the sequence of codewords

011 – 1 – 011 – 10011.

Two possible decodings of this encoded string are thus given by cdb and babe.

In general, a codeword can be found by the following idea: In the first round, we choose two codewords $x_1$ and $y_1$ such that $x_1$ is a prefix of $y_1$, that is, $x_1w = y_1$ for some "dangling suffix" $w$. If one tries first $x_1=\texttt{011}$ and $y_1=\texttt{01110}$, the dangling suffix is $\texttt{w} = \texttt{10}$. If we manage to find two sequences $x_2,\ldots,x_p$ and $y_2,\ldots,y_q$ of codewords such that $x_2\cdots x_p = wy_2\cdots y_q$, then we are finished: For then the string $x = x_1x_2\cdots x_p$ can alternatively be decomposed as $y_1y_2\cdots y_q$, and we have found the desired string having at least two different decompositions into codewords.

In the second round, we try out two different approaches: the first trial is to look for a codeword that has w as prefix. Then we obtain a new dangling suffix w, with which we can continue our search. If we eventually encounter a dangling suffix that is itself a codeword (or the empty word), then the search will terminate, as we know there exists a string with two decompositions. The second trial is to seek for a codeword that is itself a prefix of w. In our example, we have $w = \texttt{10}$, and the sequence 1 is a codeword. We can thus also continue with $w = \texttt{0}$ as the new dangling suffix.

== Precise description of the algorithm ==
Ambiguity from result
1	1	1	0	0	1	1	
d				b			
a	F			b			since d = aF
a	a	H		b			since F = aH
a	a	e					since e = Hb
1	1	1	0	0	1	1	

Example run
$C$:
a	1
b	011
c	01110
d	1110
e	10011
$S_1$:
F=a^{-1}d	110
G=a^{-1}e	0011
H=b^{-1}c	10
$S_2$:
H=a^{-1}F	10
I=a^{-1}H	0
b=H^{-1}e	011
J=I^{-1}b	11
K=I^{-1}c	1110

The algorithm is described most conveniently using quotients of formal languages. In general, for two sets of strings D and N, the (left) quotient $N^{-1}D$ is defined as the residual words obtained from D by removing some prefix in N. Formally, $N^{-1}D = \{\,y \mid xy\in D ~\textrm{ and }~ x \in N \,\}$. Now let $C$ denote the (finite) set of codewords in the given code.

The algorithm proceeds in rounds, where we maintain in each round not only one dangling suffix as described above, but the (finite) set of all potential dangling suffixes. Starting with round $i=1$, the set of potential dangling suffixes will be denoted by $S_i$. The sets $S_i$ are defined inductively as follows:

$S_1 = C^{-1}C \setminus \{\varepsilon\}$. Here, the symbol $\varepsilon$ denotes the empty word.

$S_{i+1} = C^{-1}S_i\cup S_i^{-1}C$, for all $i\ge 1$.

The algorithm computes the sets $S_i$ in increasing order of $i$. As soon as one of the $S_i$ contains a word from C or the empty word, then the algorithm terminates and answers that the given code is not uniquely decodable. Otherwise, once a set $S_i$ equals a previously encountered set $S_j$ with $j<i$, then the algorithm would enter in principle an endless loop. Instead of continuing endlessly, it answers that the given code is uniquely decodable.

See the left box for an example run of the algorithm on the given code; lower and upper case letters denote code and "dangling suffix" strings, respectively. During the construction of $S_2$, the code word b is encountered (shown in red), and the algorithm stops. The right box indicates how the example string 1110011 can be shown to have multiple encodings (db, aae), using the equations that were collected during the algorithm run.

== Termination and correctness of the algorithm ==
Since all sets $S_i$ are sets of suffixes of a finite set of codewords, there are only finitely many different candidates for $S_i$. Since visiting one of the sets for the second time will cause the algorithm to stop, the algorithm cannot continue endlessly and thus must always terminate. More precisely, the total number of dangling suffixes that the algorithm considers is at most equal to the total of the lengths of the codewords in the input, so the algorithm runs in polynomial time as a function of this input length. By using a suffix tree to speed the comparison between each dangling suffix and the codewords, the time for the algorithm can be bounded by O(nk), where n is the total length of the codewords and k is the number of codewords. The algorithm can be implemented using a pattern matching machine. The algorithm can also be implemented to run on a nondeterministic Turing machine that uses only logarithmic space; the problem of testing unique decipherability is NL-complete, so this space bound is optimal.

A proof that the algorithm is correct, i.e. that it always gives the correct answer, is found in the textbooks by Salomaa and by Berstel et al.

== See also ==
- Kraft's inequality in some cases provides a quick way to exclude the possibility that a given code is uniquely decodable.
- Prefix codes and block codes are important classes of codes which are uniquely decodable by definition.
- Timeline of information theory
- Post's correspondence problem is similar, yet undecidable.
