= Muriel Médard =

French and American information theorist and electrical engineer

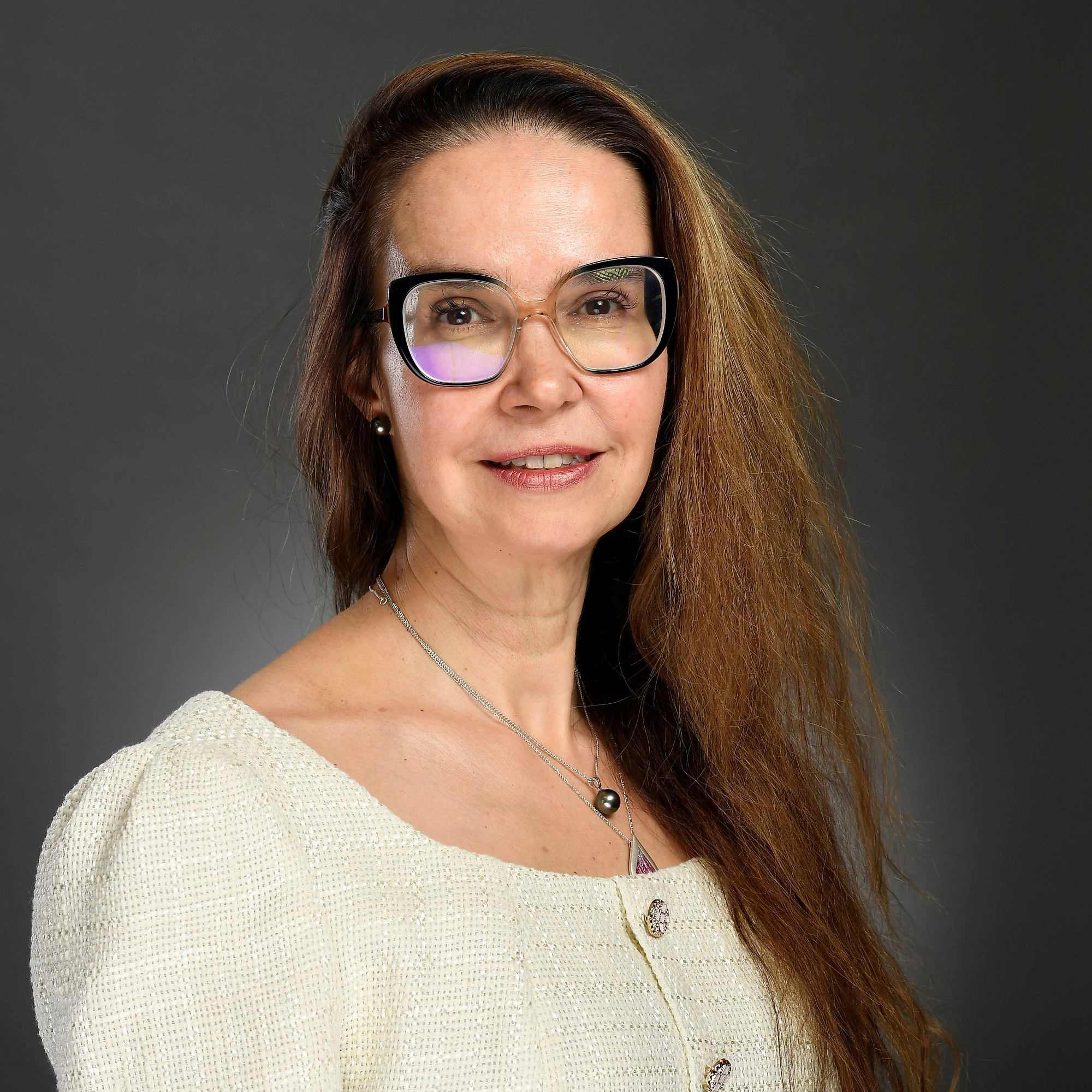
- Médard in 2026
- Born: February 1, 1968 (age 58)
- Education: Massachusetts Institute of Technology
- Known for: Research in network coding
- Title: Cecil H. Green Professor of Electrical Engineering
- Awards: Edwin Howard Armstrong award (2017), IEEE Koji Kobayashi Computers and Communications Award (2022)
- Scientific career
- Workplaces: Massachusetts Institute of Technology
- Doctoral advisor: Robert G. Gallager

Muriel Médard (born February 1, 1968) is a French and American information theorist and electrical engineer. She is the Cecil H. Green Professor of Electrical Engineering at the Massachusetts Institute of Technology (MIT) and is known for her research in network coding. She is a Principal Investigator at the Research Laboratory of Electronics.

== Education and career ==
Médard earned a Baccalauréat from the Lycée International de Saint-Germain-en-Laye, and later a bachelor's degree from MIT in 1989 with a double major in mathematics and electrical engineering. She earned a second bachelor's degree from MIT in 1991, in Russian studies, at the same time earning a master's degree in electrical engineering. She completed her doctorate (Sc.D.) in electrical engineering at MIT, with a minor in management, in 1995. Her dissertation was Capacity of Multiple User Time Varying Channels in Wireless Communications and was supervised by Robert G. Gallager.

After postdoctoral research in the MIT Lincoln Laboratory, Médard became an assistant professor at the University of Illinois at Urbana–Champaign in 1998. She returned to MIT as a faculty member in 2000.

In 2012, Médard served as president of the IEEE Information Theory Society. She is also the former editor-in-chief of the IEEE Journal on Selected Areas in Communications, and the co-founder of the companies CodeOn, Steinwurf and Chocolate Cloud. Since 2015, she has been on the Board of Trustees of the International School of Boston.

== Recognition ==
Médard became Cecil H. Green Professor in 2014.

She was elected as a Fellow of the IEEE in 2008 "for contributions to wideband wireless fading channels and network coding." In 2016 she received the IEEE Vehicular Technology James Evans Avant Garde Award. In 2017 she won the Aaron D. Wyner Distinguished Service Award of the IEEE Information Theory Society, and the Edwin Howard Armstrong Achievement Award of the IEEE Communications Society "for pioneering work in the fields of network coding, wireless communications, and optical networking". In 2018 she received an ACM Sigcomm Test of Time Award. She received an honorary doctorate from the Technical University of Munich in 2020.

She was elected as a member of the US National Academy of Engineering in 2020 and as a Fellow of the US National Academy of Inventors in 2018. In 2022, she won the Koji Kobayashi Computers and Communications Award for her work on a universal decoder. She was elected to the German National Academy of Sciences Leopoldina in 2022.

In 2025 she was elected an international fellow of the Royal Academy of Engineering. She was awarded the 2026 IEEE Richard W. Hamming Medal "for contributions to coding for reliable communications and networking".
