= Vanguard Managed Solutions =

Former American data network company

Codex Corporation Vanguard Managed Solutions Vanguard Networks
- Logo in 2004
- Founded: July 1962; 63 years ago
- Founders: James M. Cryer Jr. Arthur Kohlenberg
- Key people: Robert G. Gallager; Dave Forney
- Parent: Motorola; Platinum Equity; Raymar Information Technology

Vanguard Managed Solutions (VanguardMS) was a limited liability company (LLC) which specialized in monitoring live data networks from network operations centers (NOCs) from 2001 to 2007. It began as Codex Corporation then was a division of Motorola, and then purchased by Platinum Equity. Platinum merged the network monitoring business section to CompuCom in 2007, but retained the IP router business renamed to Vanguard Networks.

== History ==
Codex Corporation was founded in July 1962 by James M. Cryer Jr. and Arthur Kohlenberg, who were director and chief scientist at a Boston area research division of Melpar. Originally the company was a government contractor headquartered in Newton, Massachusetts. In May 1967, Codex acquired Teldata, a small company led by Jerry Holsinger that was developing data communication products that would operate at data rates of 9600 bit per second compared to the 1200 bit per second rate of existing products. Robert G. Gallager was hired as a consultant, and convinced the company to develop quadrature amplitude modulation techniques using two sidebands instead of single-sideband modulation. This technique was later refined by Dave Forney (hired in 1965) into a successful modem (modulator and demodulator) product. Within a few years it had about 20% of the market, which then was dominated by American Telephone & Telegraph.

Codex had its initial public offering in 1968. By 1970 military spending was decreasing, so pure commercial products were developed. However, the AE-96 model 9600 bit/s modems had problems in practice when manufacturing was scaled up. Holsinger left in 1970 and found another modem company: Intertel. Founding president Cryer and chief scientist Kohlenberg both died in 1970, and financing was delayed. Art Carr took over in September 1970 and reduce staff to conserve cash. A secondary public offering was held in 1972 to reduce debt and raise capital to expand.

Motorola purchased Codex Corporation on February 7, 1977. That same month, chief primary competitor Milgo was purchased by British firm Racal, after a take-over attempt by Applied Digital Data Systems. In 1982, Carr became head of the Motorola Information Systems Group, which included other acquisitions such as Four-Phase Systems in California.

The ISG division based in Mansfield, Massachusetts sold their "Vanguard" series Motorola routers to enterprise and retail markets. The Vanguard series delivered transport capabilities of multiplexing voice, legacy protocols, and IP Routing over a single Frame Relay circuit using Annex G protocol derived from X.25. The product's popularity led to its expansion of a managed services unit where existing router customers were given the option to have their network monitored in real time for Frame Relay outages, and hardware failures. This service attracted customers who preferred a hands-off approach to maintaining their own networks, and not have to deal with contacting the telecommunications company for Frame Relay Circuit outages on their own.

In 1994, Motorola re-organized ISG and combined Codex with Universal Data Systems products. The new group was called the Internet and Networking Group, with John Lockitt remaining president and chief executive of Motorola Codex.

After the dot-com bubble collapse in 2000, Motorola was forced to close or sell off some of their own business units. Holding company Platinum Equity purchased the ING division from Motorola. The acquisition was announced in July 2001 and closed on September 4, 2001.

The network management unit marketed network monitoring products and was purchased in 2007 by Court Square Capital Partners. Court Square merged the products into those of the CompuCom Systems (based in Dallas, Texas), which was also acquired at the same time.

The Multi-service router unit remained with Platinum Equity. The "VanguardMS" brand name was changed to Vanguard Networks. In February 2013 the brand was purchased by Raymar Information Technology. At that time, Raymar was located in Sacramento, California, and Vanguard continued to operate in Foxboro, Massachusetts.
