= Algebraic geometry code =

Mathematical linear code

Algebraic geometry codes, often abbreviated AG codes, are a type of linear code that generalize Reed–Solomon codes. The Russian mathematician V. D. Goppa constructed these codes for the first time in 1982.

== History ==
The name of these codes has evolved since the publication of Goppa's paper describing them. Historically these codes have also been referred to as geometric Goppa codes; however, this is no longer the standard term used in coding theory literature. This is due to the fact that Goppa codes are a distinct class of codes which were also constructed by Goppa in the early 1970s.

These codes attracted interest in the coding theory community because they have the ability to surpass the Gilbert–Varshamov bound; at the time this was discovered, the Gilbert–Varshamov bound had not been broken in the 30 years since its discovery. This was demonstrated by Tfasman, Vladut, and Zink in the same year as the code construction was published, in their paper "Modular curves, Shimura curves, and Goppa codes, better than Varshamov-Gilbert bound". The name of this paper may be one source of confusion affecting references to algebraic geometry codes throughout 1980s and 1990s coding theory literature.

== Construction ==
In this section the construction of algebraic geometry codes is described. The section starts with the ideas behind Reed–Solomon codes, which are used to motivate the construction of algebraic geometry codes.

=== Reed–Solomon codes ===
Algebraic geometry codes are a generalization of Reed–Solomon codes. Constructed by Irving Reed and Gustave Solomon in 1960, Reed–Solomon codes use univariate polynomials to form codewords, by evaluating polynomials of sufficiently small degree at the points in a finite field $\mathbb{F}_q$.

Formally, Reed–Solomon codes are defined in the following way. Let $\mathbb{F}_q=\{\alpha_1, \dots, \alpha_q\}$. Set positive integers $k \leq n \leq q$. Let
$$\mathbb{F}_{q}[x]_{<k} := \left\{ f \in \mathbb{F}_q[x]: \deg f < k \right\}$$
The Reed–Solomon code $RS(q,n,k)$ is the evaluation code
$$RS(q,n,k) = \left\{ \left( f(\alpha_1), f(\alpha_2), \dots, f(\alpha_n) \right) : f \in \mathbb{F}_{q}[x]_{<k} \right\} \subseteq \mathbb{F}_q^{n}.$$

=== Codes from algebraic curves ===
Goppa observed that $\mathbb{F}_q$ can be considered as an affine line, with corresponding projective line $\mathbb{P}^1_{\mathbb{F}_q}$. Then, the polynomials in $\mathbb{F}_{q}[x]_{<k}$ (i.e. the polynomials of degree less than $k$ over $\mathbb{F}_q$) can be thought of as polynomials with pole allowance no more than $k$ at the point at infinity in $\mathbb{P}^1_{\mathbb{F}_q}$.

With this idea in mind, Goppa looked toward the Riemann–Roch theorem. The elements of a Riemann–Roch space are exactly those functions with pole order restricted below a given threshold, with the restriction being encoded in the coefficients of a corresponding divisor. Evaluating those functions at the rational points on an algebraic curve $X$ over $\mathbb{F}_q$ (that is, the points in $\mathbb{F}_q^2$ on the curve $X$) gives a code in the same sense as the Reed-Solomon construction.

However, because the parameters of algebraic geometry codes are connected to algebraic function fields, the definitions of the codes are often given in the language of algebraic function fields over finite fields. Nevertheless, it is important to remember the connection to algebraic curves, as this provides a more geometrically intuitive method of thinking about AG codes as extensions of Reed-Solomon codes.

Formally, algebraic geometry codes are defined in the following way. Let $F / \mathbb{F}_q$ be an algebraic function field, $D = P_1 + \dots + P_n$ be the sum of $n$ distinct places of $F / \mathbb{F}_q$ of degree one, and $G$ be a divisor with disjoint support from $D$. The algebraic geometry code $C_{\mathcal{L}}(D,G)$ associated with divisors $D$ and $G$ is defined as
$$C_{\mathcal{L}}(D,G) := \lbrace (f(P_1),\dots,f(P_n)) : f \in \mathcal{L}(G) \rbrace \subseteq \mathbb{F}_q^n.$$
More information on these codes may be found in both introductory texts as well as advanced texts on coding theory.

== Decoding ==
Some algebraic geometry codes can be decoded using algorithms based on the Berlekamp–Massey–Sakata algorithm. Shojiro Sakata introduced this algorithm as an extension of the Berlekamp–Massey algorithm to multidimensional arrays. In particular, one-point algebraic geometry codes can be decoded efficiently using the Berlekamp–Massey–Sakata algorithm, and later variants have been developed for multipoint codes from algebraic curves.

== Examples ==
=== Reed-Solomon codes ===
One can see that

$RS(q,n,k) = \mathcal{C}_\mathcal{L}(D,(k-1)P_\infty)$

where $P_\infty$ is the point at infinity on the projective line $\mathbb{P}^1_{\mathbb{F}_q}$ and $D = P_1 + \dots + P_q$ is the sum of the other $\mathbb{F}_q$-rational points.

=== One-point Hermitian codes ===
The Hermitian curve is given by the equation
$$x^{q+1} = y^q + y$$
considered over the field $\mathbb{F}_{q^2}$. This curve is of particular importance because it meets the Hasse–Weil bound with equality, and thus has the maximal number of affine points over $\mathbb{F}_{q^2}$. With respect to algebraic geometry codes, this means that Hermitian codes are long relative to the alphabet they are defined over.

The Riemann–Roch space of the Hermitian function field is given in the following statement. For the Hermitian function field $\mathbb{F}_{q^2}(x,y)$ given by $x^{q+1} = y^q + y$ and for $m \in \mathbb{Z}^+$, the Riemann–Roch space $\mathcal{L}(mP_\infty)$ is
$$\mathcal{L}(mP_\infty) = \left\langle x^a y^b : 0 \leq b \leq q-1, aq + b(q+1) \leq m \right\rangle ,$$
where $P_\infty$ is the point at infinity on $\mathcal{H}_q(\mathbb{F}_{q^2})$.

With that, the one-point Hermitian code can be defined in the following way. Let $\mathcal{H}_q$ be the Hermitian curve defined over $\mathbb{F}_{q^2}$.

Let $P_\infty$ be the point at infinity on $\mathcal{H}_q(\mathbb{F}_{q^2})$, and
$$D = P_1 + \cdots + P_n$$
be a divisor supported by the $n := q^3$ distinct $\mathbb{F}_{q^2}$-rational points on $\mathcal{H}_q$ other than $P_\infty$.

The one-point Hermitian code $C(D,mP_\infty)$ is

$C(D,mP_\infty) := \left\lbrace (f(P_1),\dots,f(P_n)) : f \in \mathcal{L}(mP_\infty) \right\rbrace \subseteq \mathbb{F}_{q^2}^n.$
