= Journal of Optical Communications and Networking =

- Discipline: Optical networking
- Language: English
- Edited by: Andrew Lord

Publication details
- Former name: Journal of Optical Networking
- History: 2002–present
- Publisher: Optica, IEEE
- Frequency: Monthly
- Impact factor: 5.1 (2025)

Standard abbreviations
- ISO 4: J. Opt. Commun. Netw.

Indexing
- ISSN: 1943-0620 (print); 1943-0639 (web)
- LCCN: 2008213576
- OCLC no.: 232661993

Links
- Journal homepage; Online access; Online archive

Journal of Optical Communications and Networking is a peer-reviewed scientific journal co-published monthly by Optica and IEEE. It covers advances in optical networking. Established in 2002 under the name Journal of Optical Networking, it was subsequently retitled to its current name in 2009. The editor-in-chief of the journal is Andrew Lord.

== Abstracting and indexing ==
The journal is abstracted and indexed in:

- Current Contents/Electronics & Telecommunications Collection
- Current Contents/Engineering, Computing & Technology
- Ei Compendex
- Inspec
- ProQuest databases
- Science Citation Index Expanded
- Scopus

According to the Journal Citation Reports, the journal has a 2025 impact factor of 5.1.
