= Erdal Arıkan =

Turkish professor (born 1958)

- Born: 1958 (age 67–68)
- Education: Caltech (BS); MIT (MS, PhD)
- Known for: Polar codes
- Awards: IEEE W.R.G. Baker Award; Information Theory Society Paper; IEEE Richard W. Hamming Medal; Claude E. Shannon Award
- Scientific career
- Fields: Information theory and coding; Communication systems
- Workplaces: Bilkent University; University of Illinois
- Thesis: Sequential decoding for multiple access channels (1986)
- Doctoral advisor: Robert G. Gallager

Erdal Arıkan (born 1958) is a Turkish professor in Electrical and Electronics Engineering Department at Bilkent University, Ankara, Turkey. He is known for his invention of polar codes, which is a key component of 5G technologies.

== Early life and education ==
The son of a doctor and a homemaker, Erdal Arıkan was born in 1958 and grew up in Turkey. He attended the Middle East Technical University to study electrical engineering, but transferred to California Institute of Technology in the middle of his freshman year as a result of political violence in Turkey. He started graduate studies at Massachusetts Institute of Technology in 1981 where he was advised by Robert G. Gallager and obtained his PhD in 1986.

== Career ==
=== Academic background ===
Arıkan briefly served as a tenure-track assistant professor at the University of Illinois at Urbana-Champaign. He joined Bilkent University as a faculty member in 1987.

Arıkan developed polar codes, a system of coding that provides a mathematical basis for the solution of Shannon's channel capacity problem. He presented a three-session lecture on the polar codes at Simons Institute's Information Theory Boot Camp at the University of California, Berkeley. The lecture is also featured on the Simons Institute webpage, which includes the slides used by Arıkan in his presentation.

Arıkan is an IEEE Fellow (Class of 2012), and was an IEEE Distinguished Lecturer for 2014–2015.

=== Awards ===
Arıkan received the IEEE Information Theory Society Paper Award in 2010, and the Sedat Simavi Science Award for the construction of new channel coding schemes. Arıkan became the recipient of the Kadir Has Achievement Award in 2011 for the same accomplishment. He was named an IEEE fellow in 2012.

Arıkan received the IEEE Richard W. Hamming Award in 2018 "for contributions to information and communications theory, especially the discovery of polar codes and polarization techniques." The same year, it was announced that he would be honored with the 2019 Claude E. Shannon Award.

The Chinese telecommunications company Huawei recognized his "outstanding contribution to the development of communications technology in 2018."

=== Students ===
The list of Ph.D. dissertations completed under the supervision of Erdal Arıkan:

- Akar, Nail – Performance analysis of an asynchronous transfer mode multiplexer with Markov modulated inputs (1993)
- Abdelati, Mohamed – A framework for handling connectionless services in ATM networks (1997)
- Tan, A Serdar – Error resilient stereoscopic video streaming using model-based fountain codes (2009)
- Önay, Saygun – Polar codes for distributed source coding (2014)
- Dizdar, Onur – High throughput decoding methods and architectures for polar codes with high energy-efficiency and low latency (2017-11)
- Moradi, Mohsen – Performance and computational analysis of polarization-adjusted convolutional (PAC) codes (2022-06)
- Hokmabadi, Amir Mozammel – Hardware implementation of Fano Decoder for polarization-adjusted convolutional (PAC) codes (2022-06)
