= Valery Goppa =

Soviet and Russian mathematician

Valery Denisovich Goppa (Russian: Вале́рий Дени́сович Го́ппа; born 1939) is a Soviet and Russian mathematician.

He discovered a relation between algebraic geometry and codes, utilizing the Riemann-Roch theorem. Today these codes are called algebraic geometry codes. In 1981 he presented his discovery at the algebra seminar of the Moscow State University.

He also constructed other classes of codes in his career, and in 1972 he won the best paper award of the IEEE Information Theory Society for his paper "A new class of linear correcting codes". It is this class of codes that bear the name of “Goppa code”.

== Selected publications ==
- V. D. Goppa (1988). Geometry and Codes (Mathematics and its Applications). Berlin: Springer. ISBN 90-277-2776-7.
- E. N. Gozodnichev; V. D. Goppa (1995). Algebraic Information Theory (Series on Soviet and East European Mathematics, Vol 11). World Scientific Pub Co Inc. ISBN 981-02-0943-6.
- VD Goppa (1970). "A New Class of Linear Error Correcting Codes". Problemy Peredachi Informatsii.
- VD Goppa (1971). "Rational Representation of Codes and (L,g)-Codes". Problemy Peredachi Informatsii.
- VD Goppa (1972). "Codes Constructed on the Base of $(L,g)$-Codes". Probl. Peredachi Inf. 8 (2): 107–109.
- VD Goppa (1974). "Binary Symmetric Channel Capacity Is Attained with Irreducible Codes". Probl. Peredachi Inf. 10 (1): 111–112.
- VD Goppa (1974). "Correction of Arbitrary Noise by Irreducible Codes". Probl. Peredachi Inf. 10 (3): 118–119.
- VD Goppa (1977). "Codes Associated with Divisors". Probl. Peredachi Inf. 13 (1): 33–39.
- VD Goppa (1983). "Algebraico-Geometric Codes". Math. USSR Izv. 21 (1): 75–91. Bibcode:1983IzMat..21...75G. doi:10.1070/IM1983v021n01ABEH001641.
- VD Goppa (1984). "Codes and information". Russ. Math. Surv. 39 (1): 87–141. Bibcode:1984RuMaS..39...87G. doi:10.1070/RM1984v039n01ABEH003062. S2CID 250898540.
- VD Goppa (1995). "Group representations and algebraic information theory". Izv. Math. 59 (6): 1123–1147. Bibcode:1995IzMat..59.1123G. doi:10.1070/IM1995v059n06ABEH000051. S2CID 250882696.
