= Melpar =

American government contractor

- Historical logo circa 1960
- Founded: 1945
- Headquarters: Northern Virginia
- Services: Government research and development
- Parent: Westinghouse Air Brake; American Standard; Raytheon

Melpar was an American government contractor in the 20th century Cold War period. At a time when most employment in Washington, DC was directly by the US federal government, Melpar became an early private sector contracting company training a high technology workforce in the area.

== History ==
In 1945, after the conclusion of World War II, the founders of Melpar Inc (Thomas Meloy and Joseph Parks), at the suggestion of the United States Navy, moved from New York City to the Washington, DC area to obtain government contracts. Meloy had served as an assistant to Henry Stimson during the war. The company name was derived from the first syllable of their last names. In late 1945 Parks accidentally killed himself in a hunting accident; nevertheless Meloy continued to promote developing Melpar as an engineering and production company doing business with the Armed forces. He acquired the Carl Miller Engineering Company, a small firm that designed and produced electro-mechanical products. The new company took over a contract for airborne radar systems, and expanded. In the next few years Melpar moved to Alexandria, Virginia, added a second plant in Cambridge, Massachusetts, and a third plant in Alexandria. Within 15 years the company grew to more than 6,000 employees, and occupied ten facilities of more than 1,000,000 square feet (93,000 m^{2}) throughout Northern Virginia.

Events such as the Berlin Airlift, the detonation of the nuclear weapons by the Soviet Union, and the outbreak of the Korean War helped Melpar's business. In addition to military applications, technology began to play a role in nonmilitary areas. The US government had a pool of technical talent in its laboratories, and assumed an expanded role. The launch of Sputnik in 1957 further intensified competition with the Soviet Union.

Melpar embraced rather than shunned government work, as most other companies did. In 1951 Westinghouse Air Brake Company, a railway equipment producer founded in 1869, purchased the company for $1 million. It was a large sum for the time, despite typical profits on government contracts of only 1-2% of sales, which were generally reinvested in research.

In the 1990s, the development of the Internet, led to increased emphasis on computer science, information systems, and software technology. During the 1970s and 1980s, a similar fervor was experienced in the telecommunications and biotechnology sectors. However, during the 1950s and 1960s the most exciting technical place to advance the knowledge was the fledgling aerospace and electronics industry. The 1950-60s had many new firms and people readily working long hours. A unique feature of the 1950s, however, was that the US government, not the commercial marketplace, was the prime source of funding for new technologies.

Melpar was located near its customers in Washington, DC. Other government contractors such as Atlantic Research, Vitro Laboratories, Page Communications Engineers, Hazleton Laboratories (now Fortrea), COMSAT and the Applied Physics Laboratory also benefited. However, Melpar was the largest. In 1963, openings included astronomers, astrophysicists, microbiologists, entomologists, geophysicists and gas chromatographers. Melpar filled a void due to the lack of a technical university in the area (Melpar welcomed George Mason University in 1964).

In 1952 Melpar built an expensive, modern plant 10 miles (16 km) from downtown on a 44-acre (180,000 m^{2}) wooded tract near Seven Corners on Route 50. The new building, surrounded by fields in a campus-like setting 400 feet (120 m) back from the road, had a pond, willow trees, a brick facade, and parking behind the plant. It was a contrast to the small buildings and warehouses located downtown, and was promoted as harmonizing industrial design with residential surroundings. To accommodate Melpar, Fairfax County revamped its zoning laws to help relieve the tax burden on property owners. Melpar employees could work near their homes. In development advertising the state of Virginia touted Melpar as a model. The decision to move to the country was made more than ten years before the "circumferential highway" was completed, and more than 15 years before a shopping mall now known as Tysons Corner Center was built at Tyson's Corner. Later known as the Capital Beltway, this highway led to the term beltway bandits for the contracting firms that later proliferated.

Melpar linked production facilities to its scientific and engineering capabilities. The company won two large contracts for B-58 aircraft electronics and Minuteman missile guidance components, requiring a buildup of manufacturing plants and an associated technical workforce in the Washington area. These facilities enabled scientists to test their laboratory research with prototype hardware. By 1960 the company assembled products such as missile equipment, flight simulators, radar beacons, fuses, data processing equipment, communications, antennas, electronic countermeasure and reconnaissance systems.

Managing manufacturing programs presented a different set of challenges. Since Washington did not have a workforce of electronic technicians Melpar had to build and train one. The Minuteman production line required 1,800 people and as many as 130 were hired in a single day. Technology schools such as the Capitol Radio Engineering Institute expanded to help train designers and draftsmen to build products for space and missile programs. Universities conducted technical courses in Melpar's facilities for employees on their own time, in programs praised by the Secretary of Education. Melpar instituted tuition-reimbursement policies with incentives for high grades in technical courses. Positions for minorities and females opened at unprecedented levels.

During this time the company also pioneered manufacturing technology. Unlike today when existing commercial off-the-shelf technology is available, manufacturing had to translate ideas quickly into producible reality. Intense development occurred in areas of microelectronics technology such as the fabrication and layout of miniature circuits, and the use of thin film devices and plastic components. Processes such as welding, plating, soldering and automatic component insertion were studied and improved. Melpar's manufacturing engineers often found themselves writing engineering process documents that eventually became the government standard.

Melpar performed diverse research in physical and life sciences over 40 years. One project begun in the late 1950s (foreshadowing artificial intelligence) linked biology and the design of electrical devices–computer programs that emulated artificial nerve cells and simulated functions such as learning ability and initiative. The intent was to construct a thinking machine, similar to a human nervous system that learned pattern recognition and avoided mistakes (e.g. programming a mobile satellite on the Moon to avoid a deep precipice). Studies on the nature of speech led to more efficient use of the radio spectrum through bandwidth compression, and improved long distance and coded communications–other related studies focused on the elimination of speech deficiencies and development of a phonetic typewriter. In medical research Melpar developed synthetic materials (tissue growth) to be compatible with the heart (later known as the Jarvik heart), and produced an electronic heart monitor (Cardiac Sentry) which detected out-of-norm variations, maintained hospital records and administered prescribed treatments. The company was a pioneer in plasma physics and developed materials for communicating with crewed space vehicles reentering the atmosphere. Using solar energy, desalinization experiments were conducted to make saline and brackish water drinkable. Detection systems to measure highway curves, motions and vibrations were developed to improvemass transit systems.

Melpar performed studies in cell biology, food chemistry, composite materials (light weight, high temperature), solar energy, meteorology, virology and immunology (cancer research), air and water pollution, air traffic control, global navigation (constructed a prototype map of the Global Positioning System), and underwater acoustics and optics. They studied methane detection in mines and conversion of coal to acetylene as a new source of energy. An antenna was placed on top of the Empire State Building to evaluate the feasibility of UHF broadcasting. Offshoot products from laboratory technology included resins, varnishes, foam, nonsmudge ink, adhesives, photoelectric readers and frequency standard instrumentation. Synthetic diamonds and emeralds were produced to test hardness in space age materials. While most of Melpar's efforts were technical, some involved the social sciences–creation of a stock index of S&P 500 companies for Business Week, and operation of a Job Corps center.

Melpar continued its work on military and space applications such as radar, communications, and electronic countermeasure systems as well as airborne and ground intelligence systems. Devices to detect lethal chemical and biological agents were developed. The company participated in early uncrewed (Vanguard and Explorer) and crewed space programs (Mercury and Apollo), providing antennas and semi-dried food for lunar missions. A quarantine facility was produced to insure the astronauts had not brought any contamination from the Moon.

Melpar also produced more than a dozen flight simulators, including many for the Air Force's century series fighters and helicopter systems for the Navy. These simulators enabled more realistic and demanding training, saving pilots' lives and reducing fuel consumption during the 1970s energy crisis.

A company newspaper editorial in 1957 stated, "We have sought the breeder job, the line of inquiry promising to expand a general field of engineering endeavor or open a new one."

However, in the mid-1960s Melpar's research, engineering and production began to decline. The government's budget priorities changed, with emphasis placed on solving the nation's social problems. The human spaceflight program had few follow-on missions after landing a man on the Moon. The military's budget was heavily dedicated to the Vietnam War. These budget trends reduced Melpar's programs.

Other factors contributed to the business decline. The government did not award follow-on manufacturing contracts, so layoffs of production workers took place. The American Standard Companies, bought the Westinghouse Air Brake Company, and immediately began to sell off the assets. Melpar's research programs were diverse, unprofitable, and had uncertain business prospects.

Some unfavorable publicity contributed to Melpar's misfortunes. In 1963 Bobby Baker was Secretary for the Majority Democratic caucus in the US Senate, and closely linked to Lyndon B. Johnson - he held perhaps the most powerful nonelected position in Congress. A Melpar vending machine contractor filed a lawsuit against Baker, accusing him of influence peddling to switch the contract to a competitor, with which he had financial ties. Within a few days Baker resigned his position. For almost two years there were headlines and congressional investigations into Baker's business deals and questionable relationships. Melpar's top management was called to testify before the Senate Rules committee, although ultimately the Melpar incident was settled out of court. Even so, the situation demoralized employees, did not enhance the company's ability to win new Government contracts, and changes in company management soon took place.

An investigation was also ordered into overpricing of the B-58 systems.

Some employees left Melpar to start new companies (usually in the Washington area). Over the next 20 to 30 years more than a dozen spin-offs generated millions of dollars in annual sales and employed thousands in the Washington area. One employee began a communications company in Florida that ultimately became the Harris Corporation. Two employees from a research division near Boston formed the data communications manufacturer Codex Corporation in 1962. Many prospered in the 1970s and 1980s, but then left the area, due to industrial consolidations, mergers, and acquisitions. Meloy Laboratories continued Melpar's biotechnical, pharmaceutical research until Rhône-Poulenc moved the operation to Philadelphia in the 1980s. A flight simulator spin-off named Simulation Engineering Corporation (Secor), went through four changes in ownership in Northern Virginia–from Sperry Rand to Honeywell to Hughes to Raytheon - before being moved to Texas in 1998. The same employees started a second company, Quintron, which was purchased by Loral for $22 million and later owned by Lockheed. A few companies still reside in Northern Virginia –VSE Inc in Alexandria (1300 employees), RSI Inc in Sterling (500 employees), ISOMET in Manassas, ST Research (now a division of Boeing called Argon ST) in Newington, as well as half a dozen small machine shops.

For almost 50 years Melpar used the same facility on U.S. Route 50 in Virginia and had about 1,500 employees. The company went through several changes in ownership, being purchased by LTV Electrosystems in 1970 (changed to E-Systems in 1972) and the Raytheon Company in 1995. The name Melpar was discontinued in 1994 and the facility served as headquarters for Raytheon's Strategic Systems Division. Over the last 25 to 30 years the company performed some government electronics contracts, such as production and support of ground systems for the U-2 reconnaissance aircraft, and unmanned aerial vehicles. Additionally this facility managed information systems for agencies such as the US Department of Education, and fabricated and tested electronic products. In 2010 Raytheon moved out of the building at 7700 Arlington Boulevard, and it was remodeled for Tricare.
