= Polar code (coding theory) =

Type of error correcting code

In information theory, polar codes are a linear block error-correcting codes. The code construction is based on a multiple recursive concatenation of a short kernel code which transforms the physical channel into virtual outer channels. When the number of recursions becomes large, the virtual channels tend to either have high reliability or low reliability (in other words, they polarize or become sparse), and the data bits are allocated to the most reliable channels. It is the first code with an explicit construction to provably achieve the channel capacity for symmetric binary-input, discrete, memoryless channels (B-DMC) with polynomial dependence on the gap to capacity. Polar codes were developed by Erdal Arikan, a professor of electrical engineering at Bilkent University.

Notably, polar codes have modest encoding and decoding complexity O(n log n), which renders them attractive for many applications. Moreover, the encoding and decoding energy complexity of generalized polar codes can reach the fundamental lower bounds for energy consumption of two dimensional circuitry to within an O(n^{ε} polylog n) factor for any ε > 0.

== Construction ==
For a fixed block length and channel, constructing a polar code involves selecting the synthesized bit-channels used for information symbols. Although the recursive definition of a polar code is explicit, computing the reliabilities of all synthesized channels is difficult for general binary-input memoryless channels. Mori and Tanaka proposed a construction using density evolution for symmetric binary-input memoryless channels and identified partial-order relations among bit-channels that can simplify construction. Later methods include Tal and Vardy's degrading and upgrading approximations for bit-channel construction.

== Industrial applications ==
Polar codes have some limitations when used in industrial applications. Primarily, the original design of the polar codes achieves capacity when block sizes are asymptotically large with a successive cancellation decoder. However, with the block sizes used in industry, the performance of the successive cancellation is poor compared to well-defined and implemented coding schemes such as low-density parity-check code (LDPC) and turbo code. Polar performance can be improved with successive cancellation list decoding, but its usability in real applications is still questionable due to very poor implementation efficiencies caused by the iterative approach.

In October 2016, Huawei announced that it had achieved 27 Gbit/s in 5G field trial tests using polar codes for channel coding. The improvements have been introduced so that the channel performance has now almost closed the gap to the Shannon limit, which sets the bar for the maximum rate for a given bandwidth and a given noise level.

In November 2016, 3GPP agreed to adopt polar codes for the eMBB (Enhanced Mobile Broadband) control channels for the 5G NR (New Radio) interface. At the same meeting, 3GPP agreed to use LDPC for the corresponding data channel.

== PAC codes ==
In 2019, Arıkan suggested to employ a convolutional pre-transformation before polar coding. These pre-transformed variant of polar codes were dubbed polarization-adjusted convolutional (PAC) codes. It was shown that the pre-transformation can effectively improve the distance properties of polar codes by reducing the number of minimum-weight and in general small-weight codewords, resulting in the improvement of block error rates under near maximum likelihood (ML) decoding algorithm such as Fano decoding and list decoding. Fano decoding is a tree search algorithm that determines the transmitted codeword by utilizing an optimal metric function to efficiently guide the search process. PAC codes are also equivalent to post-transforming polar codes with certain cyclic codes. At short blocklengths, such codes outperform both convolutional codes and CRC-aided list decoding of conventional polar codes.

== Neural Polar Decoders ==
Neural Polar Decoders (NPDs) are an advancement in channel coding that combine neural networks (NNs) with polar codes, providing unified decoding for channels with or without memory, without requiring an explicit channel model. They use four neural networks to approximate the functions of polar decoding: the embedding (E) NN, the check-node (F) NN, the bit-node (G) NN, and the embedding-to-LLR (H) NN. The weights of these NNs are determined by estimating the mutual information of the synthetic channels. By the end of training, the weights of the NPD are fixed and can then be used for decoding.

The computational complexity of NPDs is determined by the parameterization of the neural networks, unlike successive cancellation (SC) trellis decoders, whose complexity is determined by the channel model and are typically used for finite-state channels (FSCs). The computational complexity of NPDs is $O(kdN \log_2 N)$, where $k$ is the number of hidden units in the neural networks, $d$ is the dimension of the embedding, and $N$ is the block length. In contrast, the computational complexity of SC trellis decoders is $O(|\mathcal{S}|^3N\log_2 N)$, where $\mathcal{S}$ is the state space of the channel model.

NPDs can be integrated into SC decoding schemes such as SC list decoding and CRC-aided SC decoding. They are also compatible with non-uniform and i.i.d. input distributions by integrating them into the Honda-Yamamoto scheme. This flexibility allows NPDs to be used in various decoding scenarios, improving error correction performance while maintaining manageable computational complexity.

== Books on Polar Codes ==
- Polar Codes: From Theory to Practice (Wiley-IEEE Press, 2025, 384 pp.) by Mohammad Rowshan and Emanuele Viterbo. The book has fourteen chapters (Introduction, Linear Codes, Fundamentals of Soft-Decision Decoding, Polar Codes, Properties of Polar Codes, Construction of Polar Codes, Monomial Codes and Permutations, List Decoding of Polar Codes, Fast SC-Based Decoding, Alternative Decoding Algorithms, Rate-Compatible Polar Codes, Polar-Coded Modulation, Performance Comparisons and 5G New Radio (NR) Polar Coding with MATLAB®) and three appendices (Conceptual Channels in 5G New Radio, Channel Coding from 2G to 5G and Scripts), providing a unified treatment from classical channel coding concepts to 5G/6G-oriented polar-code design and implementation.
- Polar Codes: A Non-Trivial Approach to Channel Coding (Springer, 2019, 170 pp.) by Orhan Gazi. It consists of five chapters (Information Theory Perspective of Polar Codes and Polar Encoding, Decoding of Polar Codes, Polarization of Binary Erasure Channels, Mathematical Modelling of Polar Codes, Channel Combining and Splitting and Polarization Rate and Performance of Polar Codes), giving an introductory but mathematically detailed account of polar encoding, decoding and channel polarization.
- High-Speed Decoders for Polar Codes (Springer, 2017, approx. 180 pp.) by Pascal Giard, Claude Thibeault and Warren J. Gross. The volume contains six chapters (an introductory chapter on polar codes followed by chapters on fast low-complexity hardware decoders for low-rate polar codes, low-latency software decoders, unrolled hardware decoders, multi-mode unrolled architectures and a concluding chapter on future work) and no separate appendices, focusing on architectural and implementation aspects of high-throughput polar decoders.
- Polarization and Polar Codes (Now Publishers, 2011, approx. 130 pp.) by Eren Şaşoğlu. This survey monograph is organized into seven chapters (Introduction, Polarization and Polar Coding, Complexity, Processes with Arbitrary Alphabets, Generalized Constructions, Joint Polarization of Multiple Processes and Conclusion and Related Work) plus five lettered appendices embedded as sections 2.A, 4.A–4.C and 6.A, providing a unified exposition of the polarization method and its generalizations to non-binary and multi-terminal settings.
