= Dave Forney =

American electrical engineer (born 1940)

George David Forney
- Born: March 6, 1940 (age 85); New York City, New York
- Awards: IEEE Edison Medal (1992); Claude E. Shannon Award (1995); Marconi Prize (1997); IEEE Medal of Honor (2016)

George David Forney Jr. (born March 6, 1940) is an American electrical engineer who made contributions in telecommunication system theory, specifically in coding theory and information theory.

== Biography ==
Forney received the B.S.E. degree in electrical engineering from Princeton University in 1961, summa cum laude, and the M.S. and Sc.D. degrees in electrical engineering from the Massachusetts Institute of Technology in 1963 and 1965, respectively. His Sc.D thesis introduced the idea of concatenated codes. He is a member of the United States National Academy of Engineering (1989) and National Academy of Sciences (2003). He is a long-time faculty member at the Massachusetts Institute of Technology.

Among other things, he is generally credited with being the first to recognize the optimality and practical importance of the Viterbi algorithm, and his tutorial paper on the subject is widely cited. His work in the Viterbi algorithm and in advancing the understanding of coding theory in general influenced the design of modern digital modems.

In 1965 he joined the Codex Corporation. His design resulted in the first mass-produced 9600 bit/s modem introduced in 1971. He spent the academic year of 1971–1972 at Stanford University, and then returned to Codex. He became vice president of research and development at Codex, through its acquisition by Motorola in 1977, serving in both management and technical positions.

He received the IEEE Edison Medal in 1992 "for original contributions to coding, modulation, data communication modems, and for industrial and research leadership in communications technology". In 1995 he received the Claude E. Shannon Award from the IEEE Information Theory Society and he received twice, in 1990 and in 2009, the IEEE Donald G. Fink Prize Paper Award. In 1998 Forney received a Golden Jubilee Award for Technological Innovation from the IEEE Information Theory Society. He has also received the 2016 IEEE Medal of Honor for "pioneering contributions to the theory of error-correcting codes and the development of reliable high-speed data communications".

== See also ==
- Forney algorithm
