= Alfréd Rényi Prize =

The Alfréd Rényi Prize is awarded biennially by the Alfréd Rényi Institute of Mathematics of the Hungarian Academy of Science in honor of founder Alfréd Rényi. By the current rules it is given to one or two fellows of the Institute in recognition of their outstanding performance in mathematics research of the previous five-year period. Members of the Hungarian Academy of Sciences and the director are not eligible.

== Laureates ==
Year	Name	Notes
1972	Gábor Halász	
1973	Endre Szemerédi	
1974	József Szabados	
1975	János Komlós	
1976	Gyula O. H. Katona	
1977	András Sárközy	Declined
1977	Gáboir Tusnády	Declined
1978	No award	
1979	No award	
1980	No award	
1981	No award	
1982	No award	
1983	No award	
1984	József Beck	
1984	Péter Vértesi	
1985	Zoltán Füredi	
1985	János Pintz	
1986	Imre Z. Ruzsa	
1986	Emil Kiss	
1987	János Körner	
1987	Hajnal Andréka	
1988	Imre Bárány	
1988	József Fritz	
1989	Péter Major	
1989	István Berkes	
1990	Pham Ngoc Ánh	Only foreign awardee (Vietnam)
1991	Antal Balog	
1991	Ervin Győri	
1992	János Pach	
1993	László Pyber	
1993	Lajos Soukup	
1994	Nándor Simányi	
1994	Gábor Simonyi	
1995	No award	
1996	Katalin Marton	
1996	Endre Makai	
1997	Gábor Fejes Tóth	
1998	András Kroó	
1999	Gábor Tardos	
2000	Péter Pál Pálfy	
2001	Mátyás Domokos	
2002	László Márki	
2003	No award	
2004	No award	
2005	András Stipsicz	From this point onwards it's awarded every odd year
2007	Andras Nemethi	
2009	Gábor Elek	
2011	Géza Tóth	
2013	Gergely Harcos	
2013	Endre Szabó	
2015	Andras Biró	
2015	Károly Böröczky	
2017	Miklós Abért	
2019	Balázs Szegedy	
2021	Márton Elekes	Gerbner and Patkós receive a separate prize to Elekes
2021	Dániel Gerbner	Gerbner and Patkós receive a separate prize to Elekes
2021	Balázs Patkós	Gerbner and Patkós receive a separate prize to Elekes
2023	Máté Matolcsi	
2023	Szilárd Révész	

== See also ==
- List of mathematics awards
- List of prizes named after people
