= University of Electro-Communications =

Japanese university

Coordinates: 35°39′21″N 139°32′39″E

- 電気通信大学
- Type: National
- Established: 1945 – The Central Technical Institute for Wireless-Communications; 1918 – The Technical Institute for Wireless-Communications
- President: Takashi Fukuda
- Administrative staff: 250
- Undergraduates: 3800
- Postgraduates: 1500
- Location: Chōfu, Tokyo, Japan
- Campus: Urban
- Colors: (DIC-256)
- Website: www.uec.ac.jp

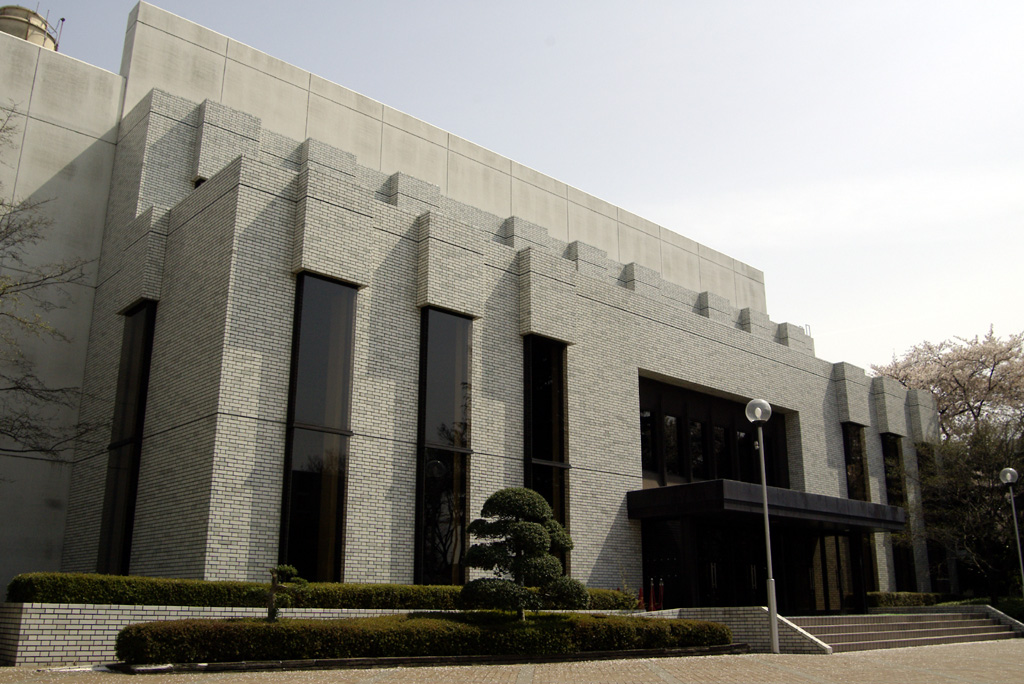
UEC auditorium

The University of Electro-Communications (電気通信大学, Denki-Tsūshin Daigaku) is a national university in Chōfu, Tokyo, Japan.

It specialises in the disciplines of computer science, the physical sciences, engineering and technology. It was founded in 1918 as the Technical Institute for Wireless-Communications.

== History ==
The University of Electro-communications was founded in the Azabu district, Tokyo city as the Technical Institute for Wireless-Communications by Wireless Association in 1918. The Technical Institute for Wireless-Communications was transferred to the Ministry of Communications in 1942 and renamed to the Central Technical Institute for Wireless-Communications in 1945. Following to the transfer from the Ministry of Communications to the Ministry of Education in 1948, the University of Electro-communications was established as a national university in 1949. The campus was moved to the city of Chōfu, Tokyo in 1957. The university has been run by the National University Corporation since 2004.

== School symbol ==
The school symbol was set in 1949. The design shows a Lissajous figure of the frequency ratio of 5 to 6 with Kanji character "學" which means "University". The frequency ratio of 5 to 6 means the commercial power frequency of 50 Hz (eastern Japan) and 60 Hz (western Japan), and indicates Japan-wide harmonization. The meaning of school symbol is common with that of school name which is "to establish a university which is open to all over Japan, by call it by a name without any geographical name".

== Rankings ==
University rankings

Regional – Overall
- THE Asia: 801–1000 (2017)

=== Global ===
The Times Higher Education World University Rankings 2018 ranks UEC in the bracket of the 801-1000 best universities in the world.

== Organisation ==
=== Faculties ===
- Faculty of Informatics and Engineering (since 2010)
  - Informatics
  - Communication Engineering and Informatics
  - Mechanical Engineering and Intelligent Systems
  - Engineering Science
  - Fundamental Programs for Advanced Engineering

=== Graduate schools ===
- Graduate School of Electro-Communications (Until 2010)
  - Information and Communication Engineering
  - Computer Science
  - Electronic Engineering
  - Applied Physics and Chemistry
  - Mechanical Engineering and Intelligent Systems
  - Systems Engineering
  - Human Communication
- Graduate School of Informatics and Engineering (Since 2010)
  - Informatics
  - Communication Engineering and Informatics
  - Mechanical Engineering and Intelligent Systems
  - Engineering Science
- Graduate School of Information Systems
  - Human Media Systems
  - Social Intelligence and Informatics
  - Information Network Systems
  - Information on System Fundamentals

=== Centers for Education and Research ===
- Institute for Laser Science
- Advanced Wireless Communication Research Center(AWCC)
- Center for Space Science and Radio Engineering (SSRE)
- Center for Frontier Science and Engineering
- Center for Photonic Innovation
- Research Center for Ubiquitous Networking and Computing
- Advanced Ultrafast Laser Research Center
- Innovation Research Center for Fuel Cells

== Notable faculty ==
- Kwan-ichi Terazawa – mathematician and member of the Japan Academy
- Noriaki Kano – consultant in quality management, recipient of the Deming Prize (1997), and also known for Kano model
- Masahiro Mori – roboticist
- Kanji Nishio – German literary figure and philosopher
- Te Sun Han – information theorist and recipient of the Shannon Award (2010)
- Hisaki Matsuura – poet and novelist

== Notable alumni ==
=== Businesspersons ===
- Ken Kutaragi, B.E. in Electronic Engineering in 1975 – former CEO of Sony Computer Entertainment, current Honorary Chairman of Sony Corporation, and also known as Father of PlayStation
- Kōichi Nakamura – video game designer and founder of Chunsoft

=== Scholars and Researchers ===
- Sumio Iijima, B.E. in 1963 – discoverer of carbon nanotubes and recipient of the Benjamin Franklin Medal (2002) and the Balzan Prize (2007)
- Seinosuke Toda, B.E. in 1982, M.E. in 1984 – computer scientist, recipient of the Gödel Prize (1998), and also known for Toda's theorem

=== Others ===
- Kiana Danial – financial expert and CEO of Invest Diva
- Noritoshi Ishida – politician and member of New Komeito Party
- Jirō Nitta – novelist
- Soichi Terada – composer and musician
