= Raymond W. Yeung =

Hong Kong information theorist (born 1962)

- 楊偉豪
- Born: YEUNG Wai Ho; June, 1962; British Hong Kong
- Education: Wah Yan College, Kowloon; Cornell University
- Known for: Information Inequalities; Network Coding
- Awards: Sumner Award (2016); Hamming Medal (2021); Shannon Award (2022)
- Scientific career
- Fields: Information Theory; Network Coding
- Workplaces: The Chinese University of Hong Kong
- Doctoral advisor: Toby Berger

Raymond W. Yeung (Chinese: 楊偉豪; pinyin: Yáng Wěiháo; born June, 1962) is an information theorist and the Choh-Ming Li Professor of Information Engineering at The Chinese University of Hong Kong, where he serves as Co-Director of Institute of Network Coding.

== Biography ==
Yeung was born in Hong Kong. He attended Wah Yan College, Kowloon for secondary school education. Then he went to the United States to study at Cornell University, where he obtained his BS, MEng, and PhD degrees in Electrical Engineering in 1984, 1985, and 1988, respectively.

In 1988, he joined the Performance Analysis Department at AT&T Bell Laboratories, Holmdel. Since 1991, he has been with The Chinese University of Hong Kong, where he is currently Choh-Ming Li Professor of Information Engineering and Co-Director of Institute of Network Coding.

Yeung’s research interests are in information theory, network coding, and probability theory. His pioneering contributions to network coding laid the groundwork for the field. He is also known for his works on information inequalities. Together with Zhen Zhang, he discovered the first unconstrained non-Shannon-type inequality, often referred to as the Zhang-Yeung inequality, that revealed the incompleteness of the previously known constraints on the entropy function. He also pioneered the machine-proving of entropy inequalities.

Yeung has published two textbooks on information theory and network coding (2002, 2008) that have been adopted by over 100 universities. His MOOC on information theory, first offered on Coursera in 2014, has reached over 60,000 students to date.

== Awards ==
- 2001: Croucher Senior Research Fellowship
- 2003: IEEE Fellow for contributions to network coding theory.
- 2005: IEEE Information Theory Society Paper Award
- 2007: Friedrich Wilhelm Bessel Research Award
- 2016: IEEE Eric E. Sumner Award
- 2018: ACM SIGMOBILE Test-of-Time Paper Award
- 2021: IEEE Richard W. Hamming Medal
- 2022: Claude E. Shannon Award
- 2022: National Academy of Inventors
- 2022: Asian Scientist 100, Asian Scientist

== Bibliography ==
=== Books ===
A First Course in Information Theory, (Kluwer Academic/Plenum Publishers, 2002)

Network Coding Theory, (now Publishers, 2005) – with S.-Y. R. Li, N. Cai, and Z. Zhang

Information Theory and Network Coding, (Springer, 2008)

BATS Codes: Theory and Practice, (Morgan & Claypool Publishers, 2017) - with S. Yang

=== Journal Publications ===
1991: "A new outlook on Shannon's information measures," IEEE Trans. on Information Theory

1994: "Matrix product-form solutions for Markov chains with a tree structure," Advances in Applied Probability - with B. Sengupta

1997: "A framework for linear information inequalities," IEEE Trans. on Information Theory

1998: "On characterization of entropy functions via information inequalities," IEEE Trans. on Information Theory – with Z. Zhang

2000: "Network information flow," IEEE Trans. on Information Theory – with R. Ahlswede, N. Cai, and S.-Y. R. Li

2002: “On a relation between information inequalities and group theory,” IEEE Trans. on Information Theory – with T. H. Chan

2003: "Linear network coding," IEEE Trans. Information Theory – with S.-Y. R. Li and N. Cai

2006: "Network error correction, Part I & Part II," Communications in Information and Systems - with N. Cai

2011: "Secure network coding on a wiretap network," IEEE Trans. Information Theory - with N. Cai

2014: "Batched sparse code," IEEE Trans. Information Theory - with S. Yang

2020: "Proving and disproving information inequalities," IEEE Trans. Information Theory - with S.-W. Ho, L. Ling, and C. W. Tan

=== MOOC ===
Information Theory

=== Software ===
1996: Information Theoretic Inequality Prover (ITIP)- with Y.-O. Yan

2020: AITIP - with S.-W. Ho, L. Ling, C. W. Tan
