= Elif Uysal =

Turkish electrical engineer

Elif Uysal is a Turkish electrical engineer whose interests in wireless communication include data freshness and the age of information, energy efficiency and the constraints on communication entailed by energy harvesting, and the analysis of stochastic processes on networks. She is a professor in Electrical and Electronics Engineering at Middle East Technical University in Ankara.

== Education and career ==
Uysal graduated from Middle East Technical University in 1997. She traveled to the US for graduate study in electrical engineering, earned a master's degree from the Massachusetts Institute of Technology in 1999, and completed her Ph.D. at Stanford University in 2003. Her dissertation, Adaptive Transmission for Energy Efficiency in Wireless Communication, was jointly supervised by Balaji Prabhakar and Abbas El Gamal.

She served as an assistant professor at Ohio State University from 2005 to 2006, before returning to Turkey to join the Department of Electrical and Electronics Engineering at Middle East Technical University.

== Recognition ==
Uysal was elected as an IEEE Fellow in 2022, "for pioneering contributions to energy-efficient and low latency communications".
