= Richard Blahut =

American electrical engineer (born 1937

- Born: June 9, 1937 (age 87); Orange, New Jersey, US
- Citizenship: American
- Education: MIT; Stevens Institute of Technology; Cornell University
- Known for: Blahut–Arimoto algorithm error control codes.
- Awards: IEEE Alexander Graham Bell Medal (1998); IEEE Claude E. Shannon Award (2005)
- Scientific career
- Fields: Information Theory; Error Control Coding
- Institutions: IBM; Cornell University; University of Illinois at Urbana
- Thesis: An Hypothesis Testing Approach to Information Theory (1972)
- Doctoral advisor: Toby Berger

Richard Ednard Blahut (born June 9, 1937) is an American electrical engineer, communications engineer, and information theorist. He is the former chair of the Electrical and Computer Engineering Department at the University of Illinois at Urbana–Champaign, is best known for his work in information theory, including the Blahut–Arimoto algorithm used in rate–distortion theory.

== Education and career ==
Blahut was born in Orange, New Jersey and studied at Massachusetts Institute of Technology, where he received his B.S. in electrical engineering, followed by an M.S. in physics from Stevens Institute of Technology. He carried out his doctoral studies at Cornell University, where he received his PhD in electrical engineering in 1972 under the supervision of information theorist Toby Berger. After graduation, Blahut subsequently taught at Cornell from 1973 to 1994 while working at IBM.

Blahut has taught at Princeton University, the Swiss Federal Institute of Technology, the NATO Advanced Study Institute, and has also been a Consulting Professor at the South China University of Technology. He is also the Henryk Magnuski Professor of Electrical and Computer Engineering and is affiliated with the Coordinated Science Laboratory. Blahut retired from the University of Illinois in 2014.

== Awards and recognition ==
Blahut was elected a fellow of the IEEE in 1981 for the development of passive surveillance systems and for contributions to information theory and error control codes. He received the Japan Society for the Promotion of Science Fellowship in 1982, when he was also the President of the IEEE Information Theory Society. He was elected a member of the National Academy of Engineering in 1990 for pioneering work in coherent emitter signal processing and for contributions to information theory and error control codes. While working at IBM, Blahut received the IBM Outstanding Contribution Award (1976), Outstanding Innovation Award (1968, 1978), Corporate Recognition Award (1979). He became a fellow of the IBM Corporation in 1980.

In 1998, Blahut received the IEEE Alexander Graham Bell Medal for "contributions to error-control coding, particularly by combining algebraic coding theory and digital transform techniques." In 2005, Blahut received the IEEE Claude E. Shannon Award.

== Books ==
- Lightwave Communications, with George C. Papen (Cambridge University Press, 2019) ISBN 978-1108427562
- Cryptography and Secure Communication, (Cambridge University Press, 2014) ISBN 978-1-107-01427-5
- Modem Theory: An Introduction to Telecommunications, (Cambridge University Press, 2010) ISBN 978-0521780148
- Fast Algorithms for Signal Processing, (Cambridge University Press, 2010) ISBN 978-0521190497
- Algebraic Codes on Lines, Planes, and Curves: An Engineering Approach, (Cambridge University Press, 2008) ISBN 0-521-77194-3
- Theory of Remote Image Formation, (Cambridge University Press, 2004) ISBN 978-0-521-55373-5
- Algebraic Codes for Data Transmission, (Cambridge University Press, 2003) ISBN 0-521-55374-1
- Algebraic Methods for Signal Processing and Communications Coding, (Springer-Verlag, 1992) ISBN 978-3540976738
- Digital Transmission of Information, (Addison–Wesley Press, 1990) ISBN 978-0201068801
- Fast Algorithms for Digital Signal Processing, (Addison–Wesley Press, 1985) ISBN 0-201-10155-6
- Theory and Practice of Error Control Codes, (Addison–Wesley Press, 1983) ISBN 978-0201101027

Awards
Preceded by Vint Cerf and Bob Kahn	IEEE Alexander Graham Bell Medal; 1998	Succeeded by David Messerschmitt
