= Frans Willems =

Dutch professor, electrical engineer and information theorist

Frans M. J. Willems (born 1954) is a Dutch information theorist and professor emeritus at Eindhoven University of Technology (TU/e). He is best known for his contributions to multi-user information theory, lossless compression, data-embedding, and biometrics.

== Life and career ==
Willems was born in Stein, the Netherlands, in 1954. He studied electrical engineering at the Eindhoven University of Technology, the Netherlands, and received his master's degree in 1979. He completed his doctoral studies at the KU Leuven, Belgium, in 1982, under the supervision of Edward van der Meulen. He then joined the Electrical Engineering Department of TU/e, where he is currently a Full Professor (emeritus). Willems also worked as an advisor for Philips Research Laboratories from 1999 to 2016. He was a member of the Board of Governors of the IEEE Information Theory Society from 1998 to 2000, and the chairman of the IEEE Benelux Chapter on Information Theory from 2007 to 2017.

== Distinctions and Awards ==
- 1982: Marconi Young Scientist Award
- 1996: IEEE Information Theory Society Best Paper Award (for the paper in which the context tree weighting algorithm was proposed)
- 2005: IEEE Fellow
- 2011: IEEE Signal Processing Society Best Paper Award
- 2014: Distinguished Lecturer of the IEEE Information Theory Society for the 2014-2015 term
- 2025: IEEE Richard W. Hamming Medal
- 2026: IEEE Claude E. Shannon Award
