= CTW =

CTW may refer to:

== Arts and entertainment ==
- Children's Television Workshop, an American educational non-profit (now Sesame Workshop)
- Crypt The Warchild (born 1980), American rapper
- West TV (callsign: CTW-32), an Australian television station (2010–2020)

== Data science ==
- Computer Technology Workshop activity at the Joint Statistical Meetings
- Context tree weighting, a lossless compression and prediction algorithm

== Other uses ==
- Carat (mass) total weight, related to diamond jewellery
- CentralWorld, a shopping mall complex in Thailand
- Change to Win Federation, the former name of the Strategic Organizing Center, a group of United States labor unions
- CTW Inc., Japanese video game company based in Tokyo.
