= János Körner =

Hungarian mathematician (born 1946)

János Körner is a Hungarian mathematician who works on information theory and combinatorics.

Körner studied Mathematics at the Eötvös Loránd University in Budapest with a degree in 1970 and was then at the Alfréd Rényi Institute of Mathematics of the Hungarian Academy of Sciences until 1992. From 1981 to 1983 he was at the Bell Laboratories and in 1987–88 at Télécom Paris (ENST) in Paris. He has been a professor at the Sapienza University of Rome since 1993.

Over his career, he frequently collaborated with fellow information theorists such as Rudolf Ahlswede, Katalin Marton, and Imre Csiszár. Together with Rudolf Ahlswede and Peter Gács he proved the blowing-up lemma. Besides information theory, he also works on extremal graph theory.

In 2014 he received the Claude E. Shannon Award. He served as Associated editor of the IEEE Transactions on Information Theory on multiple occasions. He is a member of the Hungarian Academy of Sciences.

== Books ==
- With Imre Csiszár: Information Theory: Coding Theorems for Discrete Memoryless Systems, Academic Press 1981, 2nd edition Cambridge University Press 2011.
