= István Juhász =

István Juhász may refer to:

- István Juhász (footballer) (1945–2024), Hungarian football midfielder
- István Juhász (boxer) (born 1931), Hungarian boxer
- István Juhász (mathematician) (born 1943), Hungarian mathematician
- István Juhász (canoeist) (born 2005), Hungarian canoeist
