= Yuen Kum Fai =

Singaporean academic

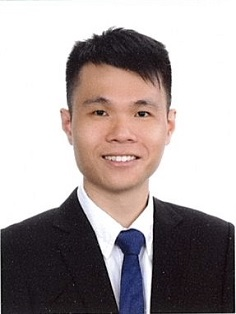
- Yuen Kum Fai in 2017
- Born: Singapore
- Education: PhD, Bsc
- Alma mater: Nanyang Technological University
- Occupation: Associate Professor
- Organisation: Nanyang Technological University
- Works: Maritime Studies; Quality Management; Sustainable Management;Organisational Performance; Technology and Innovation Management
- Website: Faculty Webpage

Yuen Kum Fai is a Singaporean academic specialising in maritime studies, strategy, and sustainable management. He is currently an Associate Professor and Assistant Chair (Students) in the School of Civil and Environmental Engineering, Nanyang Technological University, Singapore. He also serves as co-director of the Maritime Energy & Sustainable Development (MESD) Centre of Excellence. Notably, Dr. Yuen is recognised among the world's top 2% most influential scientists in both career-long and single-year categories. He is also ranked among the top ten maritime economists in shipping and port management based on the field-weighted citation index (FWCI), with a score of 2.73.

He is an appointed associate editor for Maritime Policy & Management, which is indexed by Web of Science and the flagship journal of international shipping and port research run by Taylor & Francis. In addition, he is an advisory board member for Transportation Research Interdisciplinary Perspectives owned by Elsevier. He is also an invited guest editor for the journal, Sustainability, on the special issue 'Sustainable Maritime Transportation Management and Policies', and for Maritime Policy & Management on the special issue 'Artificial Intelligence & Big Data in Shipping'. He is the recipient of the Inauguration Grant which is part of a Singapore Teaching and Academic Research Talent Scheme that aims to attract Singaporean academics to join Singapore's autonomous universities as pre-tenure assistant professors. His research interests include sustainable shipping management, service quality, supply chain integration, transport economics, and technology and innovation management. As of Mar-2025, Yuen has published over 250 international journal papers. According to Scopus, his h-index and citations are 50 and 7690, respectively.

== Education and career ==
=== Tertiary education (2008 - 2017) ===
In 2008, Yuen began his undergraduate studies, pursuing the maritime studies programme offered by Nanyang Technological University. He was in the Dean's List for two years (i.e. 2008 and 2011). He participated in the Undergraduate Research Experience on CAmpus (URECA) which had sparked his interest in research and the desire to pursue a PhD. Nearing the completion of his bachelor's degree, he was awarded the Nanyang President's Graduate Scholarship, which offered him the opportunity to pursue a four-years PhD programme in Nanyang Technological University with full financial support and allowances. In June 2012, he graduated with a first-class honours.

In August 2012, he commenced his PhD studies with Vinh Thai. His initial research topic was related to solving supply chain quality management issues in the maritime industry. However, he made the decision to switch to sustainable shipping management, which was expected to be the key focus of the maritime industry for the next few decades. During the course of his PhD studies, he attended several international conferences organised by International Association of Maritime Economist and Quality Management and Organisational Development Conference. His conference papers presented at the latter were selected as best papers for two consecutive years in 2014 and 2015. Consequently, the papers were published in the special issues linked to the conference. At the time of his graduation which was in July 2017, he had published several journal papers indexed by Web of Science.

=== Academic career (2017 - present) ===
Yuen began his career as an assistant professor at Chung-Ang University, Seoul, South Korea. He spent two and a half years at the university teaching maritime transport, transport logistics and economics, innovation logistics, principle of economics, statistics, and multivariate data analysis in English. Subsequently, he moved to Nanyang Technological University in Jan 2020, teaching quality management in shipping, shipping and the environment, maritime economics and maritime strategy.

== Academic contribution ==
Yuen's research straddles across several management fields: quality management; consumer behaviour; sustainable management; technology and innovation management.

=== Quality management ===
Yuen introduces and tests the presence of interaction effects among service quality attributes. The interactions are noted to contain additive, synergistic or compensatory effects on customer satisfaction. This finding supports and extends Kano model which mainly considers the linear and non-linear effects of an attribute but not the interaction effects of different attributes.

=== Consumer behaviour during the COVID-19 pandemic ===
Yuen reviewed the psychological causes influencing the spread of panic buying. Panic buying is a niche area of consumer behavioural studies that has gained renewed attention from academics in light of the COVID-19 pandemic. The review shows that panic buying is influenced by (1) perceived threat and scarcity of products;(2) fear of the unknown;(3) coping behaviour and (4) social influence and social trust. His comments on the causes for delays in delivery orders caused by the pandemic are also published on Today, a local newspaper.

=== Sustainable management ===
Yuen's research mainly links sustainable management with organisational performance. This includes examining its critical success factors, antecedents, contingency factors, implementation strategy and influence on stakeholders' satisfaction and loyalty.

=== Technology and innovation management ===
Yuen's research has examined the spread and management of innovation or technology adoption in a society in various contexts such as augmented reality applications, self-collection technologies and autonomous vehicles
