= András Hajnal =

Hungarian set theorist

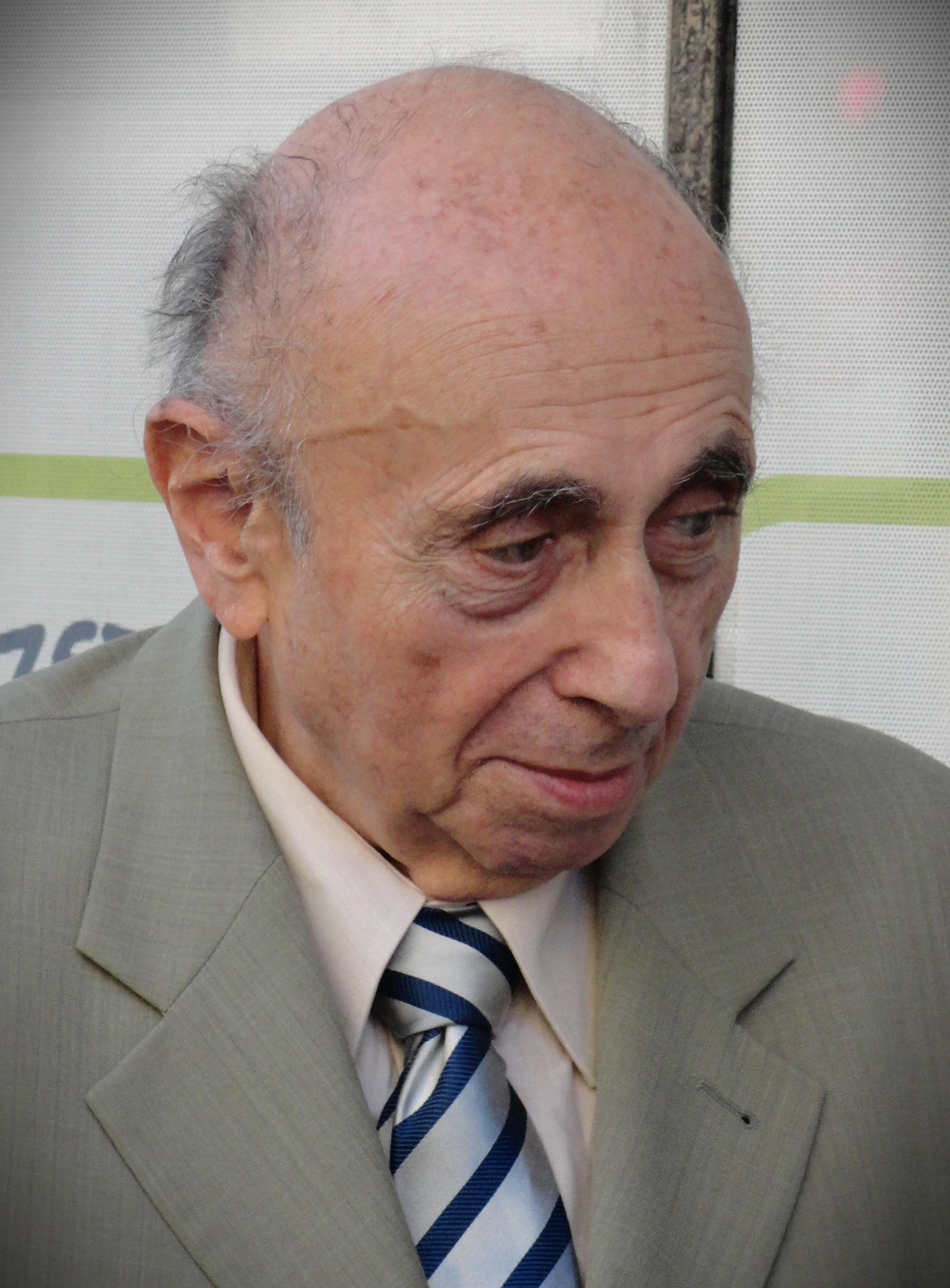
Image of Hajnal András (Photo: Mihály Hujter)

András Hajnal (May 13, 1931 – July 30, 2016) was a professor of mathematics at Rutgers University and a member of the Hungarian Academy of Sciences known for his work in set theory and combinatorics.

== Biography ==
Hajnal was born on 13 May 1931, in Budapest, Hungary.

He received his university diploma (M.Sc. degree) in 1953 from the Eötvös Loránd University, his Candidate of Mathematical Science degree (roughly equivalent to Ph.D.) in 1957, under the supervision of László Kalmár, and his Doctor of Mathematical Science degree in 1962. From 1956 to 1995 he was a faculty member at the Eötvös Loránd University; in 1994, he moved to Rutgers University to become the director of DIMACS, and he remained there as a professor until his retirement in 2004. He became a member of the Hungarian Academy of Sciences in 1982, and directed its mathematical institute from 1982 to 1992. He was general secretary of the János Bolyai Mathematical Society from 1980 to 1990, and president of the society from 1990 to 1994. Starting in 1981, he was an advisory editor of the journal Combinatorica. Hajnal was also one of the honorary presidents of the European Set Theory Society.

Hajnal was an avid chess player.

Hajnal was the father of Peter Hajnal, the co-dean of the European College of Liberal Arts.

== Research and publications ==
Hajnal was the author of over 150 publications. Among the many co-authors of Paul Erdős, he had the second largest number of joint papers, 56. With Peter Hamburger, he wrote a textbook, Set Theory (Cambridge University Press, 1999, ISBN 0-521-59667-X). Some of his more well-cited research papers include

- A paper on circuit complexity with Maas, Pudlak, Szegedy, and György Turán, showing exponential lower bounds on the size of bounded-depth circuits with weighted majority gates that solve the problem of computing the parity of inner products.
- The Hajnal–Szemerédi theorem on equitable coloring, proving a 1964 conjecture of Erdős: let Δ denote the maximum degree of a vertex in a finite graph G. Then G can be colored with Δ + 1 colors in such a way that the sizes of the color classes differ by at most one. Several authors have subsequently published simplifications and generalizations of this result.
- A paper with Erdős and J. W. Moon on graphs that avoid having any k-cliques. Turán's theorem characterizes the graphs of this type with the maximum number of edges; Erdős, Hajnal and Moon find a similar characterization of the smallest maximal k-clique-free graphs, showing that they take the form of certain split graphs. This paper also proves a conjecture of Erdős and Gallai on the number of edges in a critical graph for domination.
- A paper with Erdős on graph coloring problems for infinite graphs and hypergraphs. This paper extends greedy coloring methods from finite to infinite graphs: if the vertices of a graph can be well-ordered so that each vertex has few earlier neighbors, it has low chromatic number. When every finite subgraph has an ordering of this type in which the number of previous neighbors is at most k (that is, it is k-degenerate), an infinite graph has a well-ordering with at most 2k − 2 earlier neighbors per vertex. The paper also proves the nonexistence of infinite graphs with high finite girth and sufficiently large infinite chromatic number and the existence of graphs with high odd girth and infinite chromatic number.

Other selected results include:

- In his dissertation he introduced the models L(A) (see relative constructibility), and proved that if κ is a regular cardinal and A is a subset of κ^{+}, then ZFC and 2^{κ} = κ^{+} hold in L(A). This can be applied to prove relative consistency results: e.g., if 2^{ℵ_{0}} = ℵ_{2} is consistent then so is 2^{ℵ_{0}} = ℵ_{2} and 2^{ℵ_{1}} = ℵ_{2}.
- Hajnal's set mapping theorem, the solution to a conjecture of Stanisław Ruziewicz. This work concerns functions ƒ that map the members of an infinite set S to small subsets of S; more specifically, all subsets' cardinalities should be smaller than some upper bound that is itself smaller than the cardinality of S. Hajnal shows that S must have an equinumerous subset in which no pair of elements x and y have x in ƒ(y) or y in ƒ(x). This result greatly extends the case n = 1 of Kuratowski's free set theorem, which states that when ƒ maps an uncountable set to finite subsets there exists a pair x, y neither of which belongs to the image of the other.
- An example of two graphs each with uncountable chromatic number, but with countably chromatic direct product. That is, Hedetniemi's conjecture fails for infinite graphs.
- In a paper with Paul Erdős he proved several results on systems of infinite sets having property B.
- A paper with Fred Galvin in which they proved that if $\aleph_{\omega_1}$ is a strong limit cardinal then
  $$2^{\aleph_{\omega_1}}<\aleph_{(2^{\aleph_1})^+}.$$

This was the result which initiated Shelah's pcf theory.

- With James Earl Baumgartner he proved a result in infinite Ramsey theory, that for every partition of the vertices of a complete graph on ω_{1} vertices into finitely many subsets, at least one of the subsets contains a complete subgraph on α vertices, for every α < ω_{1}. This can be expressed using the notation of partition relations as
  $$\omega_1\to(\alpha)^2_n.$$
- With Matthew Foreman he proved that if κ is measurable then the partition relation $\kappa^+\to(\alpha)^2$ holds for α < Ω, where Ω < κ^{+} is a very large ordinal.
- With István Juhász he published several results in set-theoretic topology. They first established the existence of Hausdorff spaces which are hereditarily separable, but not hereditarily Lindelöf, or vice versa. The existence of regular spaces with these properties (S-space and L-space) was much later settled, by Todorcevic and Moore.

== Awards and honors ==
In 1992, Hajnal was awarded the Officer's Cross of the Order of the Republic of Hungary. In 1999, a conference in honor of his 70th birthday was held at DIMACS, and a second conference honoring the 70th birthdays of both Hajnal and Vera Sós was held in 2001 in Budapest. Hajnal became a fellow of the American Mathematical Society in 2012.
