= Te Sun Han =

Japanese information theorist

Te Sun Han (born 1941, Kiryū) is an information theorist and professor emeritus at the University of Electro-Communications in Tokyo. His research has focused on information theory, particularly multi-user information systems, source and channel coding, statistical inference, and information-spectrum methods. He was named an IEEE Fellow in 1990 and received the Claude E. Shannon Award from the IEEE Information Theory Society in 2010.

== Early life and education ==
Han was born in Kiryū, Gunma Prefecture, Japan, in 1941. He studied mathematical engineering at the University of Tokyo, receiving a bachelor's degree in 1964 and a master's degree in 1966. He received a Doctor of Engineering degree from the University of Tokyo in 1971. His doctoral research concerned information-theoretical and projective-geometrical approaches to sensation metrics and vowel perception.

== Academic career ==
Han joined the University of Tokyo as a research associate in 1972. He subsequently served as an associate professor at Sagami Institute of Technology from 1975 to 1983 and as a professor at Toho University from 1983 to 1985. From 1985 to 1993 he was a professor at Senshu University.

In 1993, Han became a professor at the Graduate School of Information Systems of the University of Electro-Communications, where he remained until 2007. He subsequently served as a visiting professor at Waseda University from 2007 to 2010 and as an advisor and researcher at Japan's National Institute of Information and Communications Technology (NICT). He is a professor emeritus of the University of Electro-Communications.

Han has also held visiting appointments at the University of Bielefeld, Stanford University, Nankai University, Princeton University, and Cornell University.

== Research ==
Han's research focuses on fundamental problems in Shannon information theory, including multi-user source and channel coding, multiterminal statistical inference, hypothesis testing, large-deviation methods, and information-spectrum theory. His work on the interference channel includes a 1981 paper with Kingo Kobayashi that established an achievable rate region for the channel.

Han developed the information-spectrum approach as a framework for treating information-theoretic problems involving general, including nonstationary and nonergodic, sources and channels. His book Information-Spectrum Methods in Information Theory, originally published in Japanese in 1998 and subsequently published in English by Springer, presents applications to source coding, random-number generation, channel coding, hypothesis testing, rate-distortion theory, channel resolvability, and multi-terminal information theory.

Han has also collaborated with researchers including Sergio Verdú, Kingo Kobayashi, Shun-ichi Amari, and Rudolf Ahlswede on problems in channel capacity, statistical inference, source coding, hypothesis testing, and multi-user information theory. His publications include work on channel capacity, the Slepian–Wolf coding problem, multiterminal hypothesis testing, variable-length coding, random-number generation, and wiretap channels.

== Professional service ==
Han has held leadership and editorial positions in professional organizations including the IEEE Information Theory Society and the Society of Information Theory and its Applications. He served as chairman of the Tokyo Chapter of the IEEE Information Theory Society from 1993 to 1995 and as chairman of the Society of Information Theory and its Applications from 2000 to 2001. He also served as an associate editor for the Shannon Theory area of IEEE Transactions on Information Theory.

== Awards and honors ==
- IEEE Fellow (1990)
- Okawa Publication Award (1998), for the Japanese edition of Information-Spectrum Methods in Information Theory
- IEICE Fellow (2002)
- IEICE Achievement Award (2004)
- IEICE Distinguished Achievement and Contributions Award (2010)
- Claude E. Shannon Award (2010)
- IEEE Life Fellow (2011)
- Honorary Member of IEICE (2011)
- IEICE Milestone Award (2017)
