= William Root =

William, Bill, or Billy Root may refer to:

- William Pitt Root (born 1941), American poet
- William Lucas Root (1919–2007), American information theorist
- Bill Root (ice hockey) (born 1959), Canadian retired NHL player
- Bill Root (bridge) (1923–2002), American professional bridge player, teacher, and writer
- Billy Root (cricketer) (born 1992), English cricketer
- Billy Root (saxophonist) (1934–2013), American jazz tenor and baritone saxophonist
