= Joy A. Thomas =

Indian-born American information theorist (1963–2020)

- Born: 1 January 1963; Kerala, India
- Died: 28 September 2020 (aged 57); Mountain View, California, United States
- Education: IIT Madras; Stanford University
- Occupations: Information theorist, data scientist, author
- Spouse: Priya
- Children: Two children

Joy Aloysius Thomas (1 January 1963 – 28 September 2020) was an Indian-born American information theorist, author and a senior data scientist at Google. He was known for his contributions to information theory and was the co-author of Elements of Information Theory, a popular text book which he co-authored with Thomas M. Cover. He also held a number of patents and was the founder of startups such as 'Insights One'.

== Biography ==
Joy Thomas, born on January 1, 1963, in the south Indian state of Kerala, did his schooling at St Joseph's Boys' High School, Bangalore. He stood first in the IIT Joint Entrance Examination. After graduating from the Indian Institute of Technology, Madras, he migrated to the US where he continued his studies to secure a PhD from Stanford University in 1984. It was here that he met Thomas M. Cover, the renowned information theorist, and together they wrote a book in 1991, Elements of Information Theory, which is considered by many as a benchmark text book on the subject. In 1990, he joined the IBM Research at the Thomas J. Watson Research Center as a research staff member where he worked until he became involved in the founding of Stratify, a startup founded in 1991, which was later rebranded as Iron Mountain Digital. Later, he founded InsightsOne, another startup which was subsequently acquired by Apigee in 2014.

Joy Thomas was an adjunct professor at Columbia University and Stanford University and held a number of patents. He died on September 28, 2020, at Mountain View, California, at the age of 57, survived by his wife, Priya, and children, Joshua and Leah.

== Patents ==
- "US Patent – API specification generation (Patent # 10,747,505 issued August 18, 2020) – Justia Patents Search". patents.justia.com.
- "US Patent – Automatically extracting profile feature attribute data from event data (Patent # 10,255,300 issued April 9, 2019) – Justia Patents Search". patents.justia.com.
- "US Patent – Method and apparatus for prediction of computer system performance based on types and numbers of active devices (Patent # 8,234,229 issued July 31, 2012) – Justia Patents Search". patents.justia.com.
- "US Patent – Techniques for organizing data to support efficient review and analysis (Patent # 7,945,600 issued May 17, 2011) – Justia Patents Search". patents.justia.com.
- "US Patent Application – Method and apparatus for prediction of computer system performance based on types and numbers of active devices (Application #20030023719 issued January 30, 2003) – Justia Patents Search". patents.justia.com.
- "US Patent – Adaptive multiple dictionary data compression (Patent # 5,870,036 issued February 9, 1999) – Justia Patents Search". patents.justia.com.
- "US Patent – Parallel compression and decompression using a cooperative dictionary (Patent # 5,729,228 issued March 17, 1998) – Justia Patents Search". patents.justia.com.

== Selected bibliography ==
=== Books ===
- Cover, Thomas M.; Thomas, Joy A. (11 July 2006). Elements of Information Theory. Wiley. ISBN 978-0-471-74881-6.

=== Articles ===
- Cover, Thomas M.; Thomas, A. (1988). "Determinant Inequalities via Information Theory". SIAM Journal on Matrix Analysis and Applications. 9 (3): 384–392. doi:10.1137/0609033. ISSN 0895-4798.
- Dembo, A.; Cover, T.M.; Thomas, J.A. (1991). "Information theoretic inequalities". IEEE Transactions on Information Theory. 37 (6): 1501–1518. doi:10.1109/18.104312.
