= Thomas M. Cover =

American mathematician (1938–2012)

- Born: August 7, 1938; San Bernardino, California, U.S.
- Died: March 26, 2012 (aged 73); Palo Alto, California, U.S.
- Education: Massachusetts Institute of Technology (BS); Stanford University (MS, PhD)
- Known for: Information theory Nearest neighbors algorithm Cover's theorem
- Awards: IEEE Fellow (1974); IMS Fellow (1981); Claude E. Shannon Award (1990); AAAS Fellow (1991); Member of the National Academy of Engineering (1995); Richard W. Hamming Medal (1997)
- Scientific career
- Fields: Information theory Electrical engineering Statistics; Pattern recognition
- Workplaces: Stanford University
- Thesis: Geometrical and Statistical Properties of Linear Threshold Devices (1964)
- Doctoral advisor: Norman Abramson
- Doctoral students: Joy A. Thomas; Mohammad Reza Aref; Martin Hellman; Peter E. Hart; Abbas El Gamal; Andrew R. Barron
- Website: www-isl.stanford.edu/people/cover

Thomas M. Cover (/ˈkoʊvər/; August 7, 1938 – March 26, 2012) was an American information theorist and professor jointly in the Departments of Electrical Engineering and Statistics at Stanford University. He devoted almost his entire career to developing the relationship between information theory and statistics.

== Early life and education ==
He received his B.S. in Physics from MIT in 1960 and Ph.D. in electrical engineering from Stanford University in 1964. His doctoral studies were supervised by Norman Abramson.

== Career ==
Cover was President of the IEEE Information Theory Society and was a Fellow of the Institute of Mathematical Statistics and of the Institute of Electrical and Electronics Engineers. He received the Outstanding Paper Award in Information Theory for his 1972 paper "Broadcast Channels"; he was selected in 1990 as the Shannon Lecturer, regarded as the highest honor in information theory; in 1997 he received the IEEE Richard W. Hamming Medal; and in 2003 he was elected to the American Academy of Arts and Sciences.

During his 48-year career as a professor of Electrical Engineering and Statistics at Stanford University, he graduated 64 PhD students, authored over 120 journal papers in learning, information theory, statistical complexity, pattern recognition, and portfolio theory; and he partnered with Joy A. Thomas to coauthor the book Elements of Information Theory, which has become the most widely used textbook as an introduction to the topic since the publication of its first edition in 1991. He was also coeditor of the book Open Problems in Communication and Computation.

== Selected works ==
- Cover, T. M.; Thomas, J. A. (2006). "Chapter 12, Maximum Entropy". Elements of Information Theory (2 ed.). Wiley. ISBN 0471241954.
- T. Cover, J. Thomas (1991). Elements of Information Theory. Wiley. ISBN 0-471-06259-6.
- Van Campenhout, Jan. and Cover, T. (1981). Maximum entropy and conditional probability. Information Theory, IEEE Transactions on
- Cover, T. (1974). The Best Two Independent Measurements Are Not the Two Best. Systems, Man and Cybernetics, IEEE Transactions on
- Cover, T. and Hart, P. (1967). "Nearest neighbor pattern classification". IEEE Transactions on Information Theory.
- Cover, T. (1965). Geometrical and Statistical Properties of Systems of Linear Inequalities with Applications in Pattern Recognition. Electronic Computers, IEEE Transactions on

== See also ==
- k-nearest neighbors algorithm
- Cover's theorem
