= Abbas El Gamal =

Egyptian-American electrical engineer, educator and entrepreneur

- عباس الجمل
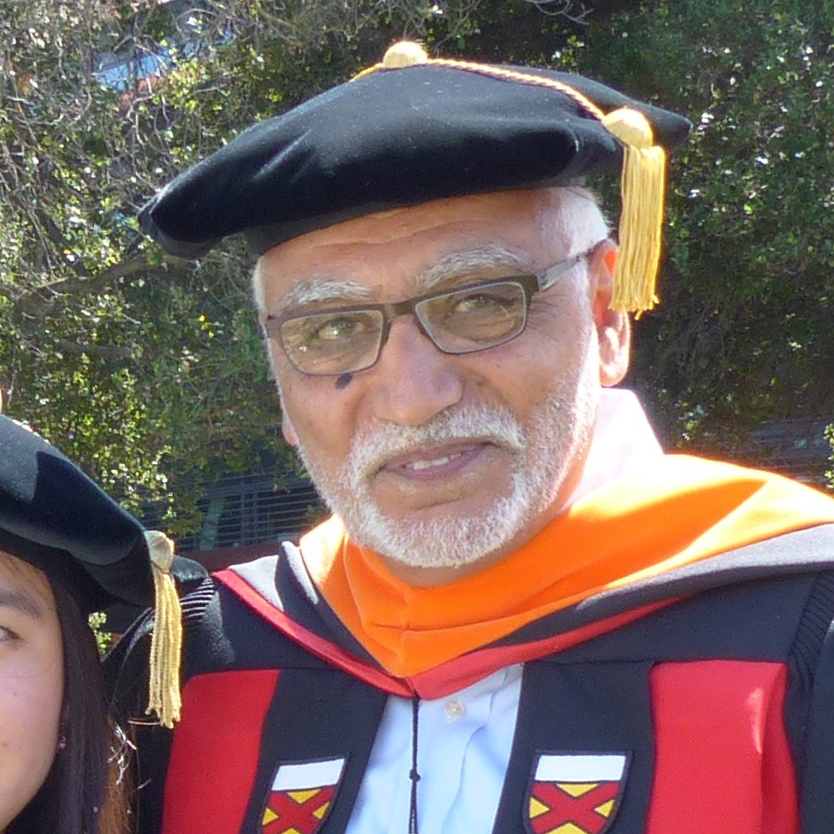
- Born: May 30, 1950 (age 76); Cairo, Egypt
- Education: Cairo University; Stanford University
- Known for: Network information theory, FPGA, digital imaging devices and systems
- Awards: 2016 IEEE Hamming Medal, 2012 Shannon Award, Member of the NAE, IEEE Life Fellow
- Scientific career
- Fields: Electrical engineering, information theory, integrated circuits
- Thesis: Results in multiple user channel capacity (1978)
- Doctoral advisor: Thomas M. Cover
- Doctoral students: Elif Uysal; Alon Orlitsky
- Website: isl.stanford.edu/~abbas/

Abbas Ahmed Amin El Gamal (born May 30, 1950), or simply Abbas El Gamal is an Egyptian-American electrical engineer, educator and entrepreneur. He is best known for his contributions to network information theory, field-programmable gate arrays (FPGAs), and CMOS imaging sensors and systems. He is the Hitachi America Professor of Engineering at Stanford University. He has founded, co-founded and served on the board of directors and technical advisory boards of several semiconductor, EDA, and biotechnology startup companies.

He co-authored the textbook ''Network Information Theory'' and co-founded the companies Actel, Silicon Architects, and Inscopix.

== Biography ==
=== Education ===
El Gamal was born in Cairo, Egypt and received his B.Sc. Honors degree from Cairo University in 1972. From Stanford, he earned an M.S. in electrical engineering in 1975, an M.S. in statistics in 1977 and his Ph.D. in 1978.

=== Academic career ===
El Gamal was an assistant professor in the Department of Electrical Engineering from 1978 to 1980. He has been on the faculty of the Department of Electrical Engineering since 1981. He was director of the Information Systems Laboratory from 2004 to 2009. From 2012 to 2017 he was chair of the Department of Electrical Engineering at Stanford University.

In his primary field, network information theory, El Gamal studies the absolute performance limits of communication and computing networks and develops algorithms and protocols to achieve these limits. He published highly cited papers on several classical problems in the field and co-authored its first textbook, Network Information Theory.

El Gamal was also a key figure in the development of CMOS image sensors, the technology widely used today in cell phone and digital cameras. He started the industrially funded Programmable Digital Camera project, which helped spur several key innovations in the field and funded several PhD students who became leaders in the image sensor industry and research. He also developed an award-winning course on the topic.

=== Business ===
In 1986, he cofounded Actel – only the second FPGA company in the world – where he made several key inventions in FPGA architecture and held multiple posts, including that of chief scientist until 1990. Actel was acquired by Microsemi in 2010.

In 1990, he founded Silicon Architects – one of the first silicon IP companies in the world – holding multiple posts, including that of chief technical officer until its acquisition by Synopsys in 1995, where he was a vice president until 1997.

In 2011, El Gamal co-founded Inscopix, a neurotech company developing tools to enable monitoring of brain activity in vivo. He serves on its board of directors.

== Awards and honors ==
- 2016 IEEE Richard W. Hamming Medal
- 2014 Viterbi Lecture, University of Southern California
- 2013 Shannon Memorial Lecture, UCSD
- 2013 Member of the National Academy of Engineering
- 2012 Claude E. Shannon Award, IEEE Information Theory Society
- 2000 Fellow, Institute of Electrical and Electronics Engineers

== Bibliography ==
=== Books ===
Network Information Theory, (Cambridge University Press, 2011) – with Young-Han Kim

=== Journals ===
2011: "Miniaturized integration of a fluorescence microscope," Nature Methods – with K. Ghosh, L. Burns, E. Cocker, A. Nimmerjahn, Y. Ziv, M. Schnitzer

2006: "Throughput-Delay Trade-offs in Wireless Networks," in two parts, IEEE Trans. Inf. Theory – with J. Mammen, B. Prabhakar, and D. Shah

2002: "Energy-efficient Packet Transmission over a Wireless Link," IEEE/ACM Transactions on Networking –with E. Uysal-Biyikoglu and B. Prabhakar

2001: "A 10,000 Frames/s CMOS Digital Pixel Sensor," IEEE Journal of Solid-State Circuits – with S. Kleinfelder, S. Lim, X. Liu

1982: Achievable rates for multiple descriptions – with T. Cover

1979: Capacity theorems for the relay channel – with T. Cover

== See also ==
- Stanford University School of Engineering
