= Andrew R. Barron (statistician) =

American information theorist

- Known for: Neural network approximation theory Minimum description length Information-theoretic central limit theorem
- Awards: Claude E. Shannon Award (2024); IMS Medallion Lecture (2005); IEEE Browder J. Thompson Prize (1992); IEEE Fellow

Academic background
- Education: Rice University (BS); Stanford University (MS, PhD)
- Thesis: Logically Smooth Density Estimation (1985)
- Doctoral advisor: Thomas M. Cover

Andrew R. Barron is an American statistician and information theorist. He was the Charles C. and Dorothea S. Dilley Professor of Statistics and Data Science at Yale University until his retirement in 2024.

== Education and career ==
Barron received a B.S. in Electrical Engineering and Mathematical Sciences from Rice University in 1981, and a M.S. (1982) and Ph.D. (1985) in Electrical Engineering from Stanford University, where his doctoral advisor was Thomas M. Cover.

After completing his doctorate, Barron joined the faculty at the University of Illinois Urbana-Champaign, where he held appointments in the departments of Statistics and Electrical and Computer Engineering. In 1992, he moved to Yale University, where he served as Chair of the Department of Statistics from 2001 to 2006.

== Personal life ==
Barron is a FAI free flight model glider competitor in the F1A class. He is a five-time U.S. National Champion, winning in 1984, 1987, 1992, 2007, and 2009.

== Awards and honors ==
- Claude E. Shannon Award, IEEE Information Theory Society (2024)
- Medallion Lecture, Institute of Mathematical Statistics (2005)
- Browder J. Thompson Memorial Prize, IEEE (1992)
- IEEE Fellow
