= Alon Orlitsky =

Israeli-American information theorist (born 1958)

- אלון אורליצקי
- Born: July 25, 1958 (age 68)
- Education: Ben-Gurion University; Stanford University
- Awards: Claude E. Shannon Award
- Scientific career
- Fields: Information Theory
- Workplaces: Bell Labs; D. E. Shaw & Co. University of California, San Diego
- Doctoral advisor: Abbas El Gamal

Alon Orlitsky (Hebrew: אלון אורליצקי; born July 25, 1958) is an Israeli-American information theorist and the Qualcomm Professor for Information Theory and its Applications at University of California, San Diego.

== Education and career ==
Orlitsky received a BSc in Mathematics and Electrical Engineering from Ben Gurion University in 1981, and a PhD in Electrical Engineering from Stanford University in 1986. He was a member of Bell Labs from 1986 to 1996, and worked for D. E. Shaw from 1996 to 1997. He joined UCSD in 1997. Orlitsky is known for his contribution to the fields of communication complexity, source coding, and more recently in probability estimation.

== Honors and awards ==
Orlitsky is a recipient of the IEEE W.R.G. Baker Award in 1992, the IEEE Information Theory Society paper award in 2006, a best paper award at NeurIPS in 2015, and a best paper honorable mention at International Conference on Machine Learning in 2017, and the 2021 Claude E. Shannon Award of IEEE Information Theory Society.
