= IEEE International Symposium on Information Theory =

IEEE conference

Cities that have hosted ISIT. Larger dots are used when the city hosted the symposium several times.

The IEEE International Symposium on Information Theory (ISIT) is the flagship meeting of the IEEE Information Theory Society. Every year and during the course of a week, researchers in the field of information theory gather to share their work in a series of presentations. The main event of the symposium is the Shannon Lecture, which is given by the recipient of the prestigious Claude E. Shannon Award of the year; the year's awardee was revealed during the previous ISIT.

== History ==
The first meeting took place in 1950, although back then it was only called "Information Theory". Claude Shannon was a major participant; he had published his seminal work A Mathematical Theory of Communication only two years before this meeting.

The symposium was held sporadically in the beginning and it has become a yearly event only after the turn of the millennium.

== Conferences ==
History of the ISIT conference
| Year | City | Country | Date |
|---|---|---|---|
| 2027 | Sorrento | Italy | June 27 - July 2 |
| 2026 | Guangzhou | China | June 28 – July 3 |
| 2025 | Ann Arbor | United States of America | June 22–27 |
| 2024 | Athens | Greece | July 7–12 |
| 2023 | Taipei | Taiwan | 25–30 June |
| 2022 | Espoo | Finland | 26 June - 1 July |
| 2021 | Melbourne | Australia | 12–20 July |
| 2020 | Los Angeles | United States of America | 21–26 June |
| 2019 | Paris | France | 7–12 July |
