= IEEE Richard W. Hamming Medal =

Technical award

- Awarded for: Exceptional contributions to information sciences, systems, and technology.
- Presented by: Institute of Electrical and Electronics Engineers
- First award: 1986
- Website: IEEE Richard W. Hamming Medal

The IEEE Richard W. Hamming Medal is presented annually to up to three persons, for outstanding achievements in information sciences, information systems and information technology. The recipients receive a gold medal, together with a replica in bronze, a certificate and an honorarium.

The award was established in 1986 by the Institute of Electrical and Electronics Engineers (IEEE) and is sponsored by Qualcomm, Inc. It is named after Richard W. Hamming, whose work has had many implications for computer science and telecommunications. His contributions include the invention of the Hamming code, and error-correcting code.

== Recipients ==
The following people have received the IEEE Richard W. Hamming Medal:

- 2026: Muriel Médard
- 2025: Frans Willems
- 2024: Alexander Barg
- 2023: Frank Kschischang
- 2022: Madhu Sudan
- 2021: Raymond W. Yeung
- 2020: Cynthia Dwork
- 2019: David Tse
- 2018: Erdal Arıkan
- 2017: Shlomo Shamai
- 2016: Abbas El Gamal
- 2015: Imre Csiszar
- 2014: Thomas Richardson and Rüdiger L. Urbanke
- 2013: Robert Calderbank
- 2012: Michael Luby, Amin Shokrollahi
- 2011: Toby Berger
- 2010: Whitfield Diffie, Martin Hellman and Ralph Merkle
- 2009: Peter Franaszek
- 2008: Sergio Verdú
- 2007: Abraham Lempel
- 2006: Vladimir I. Levenshtein
- 2005: Neil J.A. Sloane
- 2004: Jack K. Wolf
- 2003: Claude Berrou and Alain Glavieux
- 2002: Peter Elias
- 2001: A. G. Fraser
- 2000: Solomon W. Golomb
- 1999: David A. Huffman
- 1998: David D. Clark
- 1997: Thomas M. Cover
- 1996: Mark S. Pinsker
- 1995: Jacob Ziv
- 1994: Gottfried Ungerboeck
- 1993: Jorma J. Rissanen
- 1992: Lotfi A. Zadeh
- 1991: Elwyn R. Berlekamp
- 1990: Dennis M. Ritchie and Kenneth L. Thompson
- 1989: Irving S. Reed
- 1988: Richard W. Hamming

== See also ==
- Richard W. Hamming
- List of computer science awards
- Prizes named after people
