= Claude Berrou =

French professor in electrical engineering

Claude Berrou (French: [klod bɛʁu]; born 23 September 1951 in Penmarch) is a French professor in electrical engineering at École Nationale Supérieure des Télécommunications de Bretagne, now IMT Atlantique. He is the sole inventor of a groundbreaking quasi-optimal error-correcting coding scheme called turbo codes as evidenced by the sole inventorship credit given on the fundamental patent for turbo codes. The original patent filing for turbo codes issued in the US as US Patent 5,446,747.

A 1993 paper entitled "Near Shannon Limit Error-correcting Coding and Decoding: Turbo-codes" published in the Proceedings of IEEE International Communications Conference was the first public disclosure of turbo codes. This 1993 paper listed three authors because it was formed from three separate submissions that were combined due to space constraints. The three authors listed on the 1993 paper are: Berrou, Glavieux, and Thitimajshima. Because the 1993 paper was the first public introduction of turbo codes (patents remain unpublished until issued), coinventorship credit for the discovery to turbo code is often erroneously given to Glavieux and/or Thitimajshima. While Berrou and Glavieux did go on to do supplemental work together, the original development of turbo codes was performed by Berrou alone.

Berrou also codeveloped turbo equalization (see turbo equalizer.) Turbo equalization is also known as iterative reception or iterative detection.

Turbo codes have been used in all the major cellular communications standards since 3G and are currently part of the LTE (Long Term Evolution) cellular protocol. They are also used in the Inmarsat satellite communications protocol and well as the DVB-RCS and DVB-RCS2 communications protocols.

Hard disk drives started using turbo equalization for their read channel in 2008. By 2012 all hard disk drives used turbo equalization and this remains the case to this day.

In 2009, he was elected as an IEEE fellow for invention of turbo codes, generalization of the turbo principle in receivers, and influence in standardization.

Between mobile phones and hard disk drives, several billion devices have incorporated key technology developed by Claude Berrou.

== Key research activities ==
His current research activities are now concentrated on the application and extension of the turbo technology in various domains, including his research on artificial thinking, because turbo decoding has been recognized as a new instance of the very general principle of belief propagation; one application of this principle has been invented for the decoding of low-density parity-check codes (LDPC codes also known as Gallager codes, in honor of Robert G. Gallager, who developed the LDPC concept in his doctoral dissertation at MIT in 1960 as a theoretical model whose practical implementation was not widely developed until recently). The turbo principle is generalized now by Claude Berrou and his lab team for the processing of various functions such as the demodulation, the detection or the equalization using a network of multiple convolution codes working in parallel with probabilistic feedback.

Other subjects of interest include all their possible applications in the field of artificial intelligence, for example with a better understanding of natural biological thinking and memory for the implementation of such model using neural networks for the processing of pulsed signals with software and hardware methods with auto-selected and self-maintained combinations of activation cycles of adjacent neurons.

== Publications ==
He is the author or coauthor of several books related to turbocodes and their encoding/decoding methods or implementation devices:

- (in French) Codes et turbocodes (Codes and turbo codes) by Claude Berrou with Karine Amis Cavalec, Alain Glavieux, Matthieu Arzel, Michel Jezequel, Charlotte Langlais, Raphaël Le Bidan, Samir Saoudi, Gérard Battail, Emmanuel Boutillon, Yannick Saouter, Emeric Maury, Christophe Laot, Sylvie Kerouedan, Frédéric Guilloud, and Catherine Douillard. Paris: Springer (2007), 397 p. (Iris), ISBN 978-2-287-32739-1.
- (in French) Codage de canal — des bases théoriques aux turbocodes (Channel encoding — from theoretical grounds to turbocodes) by Alain Glavieux with Patrick Adde, Gérard Battail, Ezio Biglieri, Michel Jezequel, Alain Poli, Sandrine Vaton, Ramesh Pyndiah, Annie Picart, Catherine Douillard, and Claude Berrou. Paris: Hermès Science / Lavoisier (2005), 453 p. (Traité IC2 : Traitement du signal et de l’image), ISBN 2-7462-0953-5.

He wrote many chapters in various books related to turbocodes in US publications, published several articles in various international research magazines with scientific review committees, and made many communications in international conferences with review committees.

During his work on turbocodes and parallel convolutive encoding and decoding, he has authored several registered patents for methods and devices implementing this technology:

- (in French) Procédé de codage convolutif correcteur d’erreurs pseudo-systématique, procédé de décodage et dispositifs correspondants (Apparatus of pseudo-systematic error-correcting convolutive coding, associated decoding process and devices) by Claude Berrou and Patrick Adde (Institut TELECOM; Telecom Bretagne; France Telecom & TDF), France, April 1991.
- (in French) Procédé de décodage d’un code convolutif à maximum de vraisemblance et pondération des décisions et décodeur correspondant (Apparatus of decoding for a convolutive code with maximum likelihood and weighted decisions, and associated decoder) by Claude Berrou (Institut TELECOM; Telecom Bretagne), France, April 1992.
- (in French) Procédé de codage correcteur d’erreurs à au moins deux codages convolutifs systématiques en parallèle, procédé de décodage itératif, module de décodage et décodeur correspondants (Apparatus of error-detecting encoding using at least two systematic convolutive encodings in parallel, process of iterative decoding, and associated decoding module and decoder) by Claude Berrou (Institut TELECOM; Telecom Bretagne; France Telecom & TDF), France, April 1992.
- (in French) Décodage itératif de codes produits (Iterative decoding of product codes) by Ramesh Pyndiah, Alain Glavieux and Claude Berrou (Institut TELECOM; Telecom Bretagne; France Telecom), France, November 1993.
- (in French) Dispositif de réception de signaux numériques à structure itérative, module et procédé correspondants (Numeric signals device with iterative structure, associated module and process), by Catherine Douillard, Alain Glavieux, Michel Jezequel and Claude Berrou (Institut TELECOM; Telecom Bretagne; France Telecom & TDF), France, February 1995.
- (in French) Procédé et dispositif de codage convolutif de blocs de données et procédé et dispositif de décodage correspondants (Apparatus and devices for the convolutive encoding of data blocks, and associated process and decoding device) by Claude Berrou and Michel Jezequel (Institut TELECOM; Telecom Bretagne; France Telecom et TDF), France, April 1996.
- (in French) Procédé et dispositif de codage à au moins deux codages en parallèle et permutation améliorée, et procédé et dispositif de décodage correspondants (Apparatus and device for the encoding with at least two parallel encoders and enhanced permutation, and associated process and decoding device) by Claude Berrou and Alain Glavieux (Institut TELECOM; Telecom Bretagne; GET), France, July 1999.
- (in French) Procédé de qualification de codes correcteurs d’erreurs, procédé d’optimisation, codeur, décodeur et application correspondants (Apparatus for the qualification of error-correcting codes, and associated optimization process, encoder, decoder and application) by Claude Berrou, Michel Jezequel and Catherine Douillard (Institut TELECOM; Telecom Bretagne; France Telecom & GET), France September 2001.

== Distinctions ==
He has received several distinctions:

- the SEE Ampère Medal (1997).
- the Golden Jubilee Award for Technological Innovation of IEEE Information Theory Society (1998), together with Alain Glavieux and Punya Thitimajshima.
- the IEEE Richard W. Hamming Medal (2003), together with Alain Glavieux.
- the French Grand Prix France Télécom of Académie des sciences (2005).
- the Marconi Prize (2005).

He was nominated for the European Inventor of the Year Award (2006).

He was elected a member of the French Academy of Sciences in 2007.

== See also ==
- Institut TELECOM
- Low-density parity-check code (LDPC code)
