= Noriaki Kano =

Japanese educator, writer, and consultant

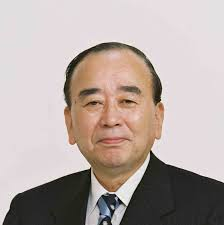
- Born: 1940 (age 85–86); Tokyo, Japan
- Citizenship: Japan
- Education: University of Tokyo
- Known for: Kano model
- Awards: Deming Prize for Individuals
- Scientific career
- Fields: Engineering, management science
- Workplaces: Tokyo University of Science, University of Electro-Communications

Noriaki Kano (狩野紀昭 Kanō Noriaki, pronounced [kanoː noɾiaki]) is a Japanese educator, lecturer, writer, and consultant in the field of quality management. He is the developer of a customer satisfaction model (now known as the Kano model) whose simple ranking scheme distinguishes between essential and differentiating attributes related to concepts of customer quality. He is a professor emeritus of the Tokyo University of Science. He was Visiting Professor at the University of Rome III during the academic year 2010-2011.

== Contributions to quality ==
In the late 1970s and early 1980s Kano and his colleagues laid the foundation for a new approach to modeling customer satisfaction. Kano challenged the conventional beliefs that improving each attribute of a company's product or service will lead to increased customer satisfaction. Kano believed that not all attributes of product or service performance are equal in the eyes of the customer, and that some attributes create higher levels of customer loyalty than others.

One of his well-known books is the Guide to TQM in Service Industries.

== Academic achievements, awards and honors ==
Noriaki Kano completed his undergraduate, masters, and doctoral degrees in the engineering school of the University of Tokyo. He retired from the Tokyo University of Science (TUS) after 35 years in research and education, as a lecturer and associate professor at the University of Electro-Communications and a full professor and head of the Department of Management Science at TUS.

He was the 1997 recipient of the Deming Prize for Individuals, administered by the Japanese Union of Scientists and Engineers (JUSE). In 1997 he also received the Deming Lecturer Award of the American Statistical Association; his paper for the annual Deming Lecture was titled "Business Strategies for the 21st Century and Attractive Quality Creation."

Kano is the only honorary member of three societies i.e. International Academy for Quality (IAQ), American Society for Quality (ASQ) and Japan Society for Quality Control (JSQC). He was the recipient of two ASQ Medals of Distinction: the E. Jack Lancaster Medal for 2002 and the E. L. Grant Medal for 2007. Kano is a recipient of the Georges Borel Award for international contribution by the European Organization for Quality (EOQ). Kano is the Honorary Chairperson of Asian Network for Quality (ANQ).

== Publications ==
- Kano, Noriaki, ed. (1996). Guide to TQM in Service Industries. Tokyo: Asian Productivity Organization. ISBN 978-92-833-1130-0.
