= Punya Thitimajshima =

Punya Thitimajshima (9 November 1955 – 9 May 2006), a Thai professor in the department of telecommunications engineering at King Mongkut's Institute of Technology at Ladkrabang, was the co-inventor with Claude Berrou and Alain Glavieux of a groundbreaking coding scheme called turbo codes.

Thitimajshima was educated at King Mongkut's Institute of Technology at Ladkrabang, where he earned his bachelor's degree in control engineering and master's degree in electrical engineering. Later he went to École Nationale Supérieure des Télécommunications de Bretagne and Universite de Bretagne Occidentale in France, where he studied telecommunications engineering and received a doctoral degree in 1993 for a dissertation titled "Systematic recursive convolutional codes and their application to parallel concatenation." Thitimajshima joined the faculty of KMITL in 1995 as a lecturer, and became associate professor.

He was the recipient of the 1998 Golden Jubilee Award for Technological Innovation from the IEEE Information Theory Society together with Berrou and Glavieux. In 2003 he received the Outstanding Technologist Award presented by the Foundation for Promotion of Science and Technology under the Patronage of His Majesty the King of Thailand. He died on 9 May 2006 at the age of 51 from illness.
