= Alfréd Rényi =

Hungarian mathematician (1921–1970)

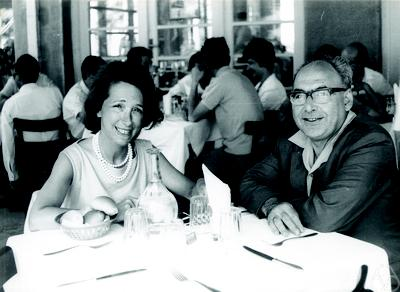
- Born: 20 March 1921; Budapest, Hungary
- Died: 1 February 1970 (aged 48); Budapest, Hungary
- Education: University of Szeged
- Scientific career
- Fields: Mathematics
- Workplaces: Eötvös Loránd University
- Doctoral advisor: Frigyes Riesz
- Doctoral students: Imre Csiszár; Gyula O. H. Katona; János Komlós; András Prékopa; Gábor Székely; Janos Galambos

Alfréd Rényi (20 March 1921 – 1 February 1970) was a Hungarian mathematician known for his work in probability theory, though he also made contributions in combinatorics, graph theory, and number theory.

== Life ==
Rényi was born in Budapest to Artúr Rényi and Borbála Alexander; his father was a mechanical engineer, while his mother was the daughter of philosopher and literary critic Bernhard Alexander; his uncle was Franz Alexander, a Hungarian-American psychoanalyst and physician.

He was prevented from enrolling in university in 1939 due to the anti-Jewish laws then in force, but enrolled at the University of Budapest in 1940 and finished his studies in 1944. At this point, he was drafted to forced labour service, from which he managed to escape during transportation of his company. He was in hiding with false documents for six months. Biographers tell an incredible story about Rényi: after half of a year in hiding, he managed to get hold of a soldier's uniform and march his parents out of the Budapest Ghetto, where they were captive. That mission required enormous courage and planning skills.

Rényi then completed his PhD in 1947 at the University of Szeged, under the advisement of Frigyes Riesz. He did his postgraduate in Moscow and Leningrad, where he collaborated with a prominent Soviet mathematician Yuri Linnik.

Rényi married Katalin Schulhof (who used Kató Rényi as her married name), herself a mathematician, in 1946; their daughter Zsuzsanna was born in 1948. After a brief assistant professorship at Budapest, he was appointed Professor Extraordinary at the University of Debrecen in 1949. In 1950, he founded the Mathematics Research Institute of the Hungarian Academy of Sciences, now bearing his name, and directed it until his early death. He also headed the Department of Probability and Mathematical Statistics of the Eötvös Loránd University, from 1952. He was elected a corresponding member (1949), then full member (1956), of the Hungarian Academy of Sciences.

== Work ==
Rényi proved, using the large sieve, that there is a number $K$ such that every even number is the sum of a prime number and a number that can be written as the product of at most $K$ primes. Chen's theorem, a strengthening of this result, shows that the theorem is true for K = 2, for all sufficiently large even numbers. The case K = 1 is the still-unproven Goldbach conjecture.

In information theory, he introduced the spectrum of Rényi entropies of order α, giving an important generalisation of the Shannon entropy and the Kullback–Leibler divergence. The Rényi entropies give a spectrum of useful diversity indices, and lead to a spectrum of fractal dimensions. The Rényi–Ulam game is a guessing game where some of the answers may be wrong.

In probability theory, he is also known for his parking constants, which characterize the solution to the following problem: given a street of some length and cars of unit length parking on a random free position on the street, what is the mean density of cars when there are no more free positions? The solution to that problem is asymptotically equal to 0.7475979 (sequence A050996 in the OEIS). Thus, random parking is 25.2% less efficient than optimal packing.

He wrote 32 joint papers with Paul Erdős, the most well-known of which are his papers introducing the Erdős–Rényi model of random graphs.

The corpus of his bibliography was compiled by the mathematician Pál Medgyessy.

== Quotations ==
Rényi, who was addicted to coffee, is the source of the quote: "A mathematician is a device for turning coffee into theorems", which is often ascribed to Erdős. It has been suggested that this sentence was originally formulated in German, where it can be interpreted as a double entendre on the meaning of the word Satz (theorem or coffee residue), but it is more likely that the original formulation was in Hungarian.

He is also famous for having said, "If I feel unhappy, I do mathematics to become happy. If I am happy, I do mathematics to keep happy."

== Remembrance ==
The Alfréd Rényi Prize, awarded by the Hungarian Academy of Science, was established in his honor.

In 1950 Rényi founded the Mathematics Research Institute of the Hungarian Academy of Sciences. It was renamed the Alfréd Rényi Institute of Mathematics in July 1999.

== Books ==
- A. Rényi: Dialogues on Mathematics, Holden-Day, 1967.
- A. Rényi: A diary on information theory, Akadémiai Kiadó
- A. Rényi, Foundations of Probability, Holden-Day, Inc., San Francisco, 1970, xvi + 366 pp
- A. Rényi, Probability Theory. American Elsevier Publishing Company, New York, 1970, 666 pp.
- A. Rényi, Letters on Probability, Wayne State University Press, Detroit, 1972, 86pp.

Foundations of Probability and Probability Theory have both been reprinted by Dover Publications.

== Sources ==
- Hersh, Reuben (1993). "A Visit to Hungarian Mathematics". The Mathematical Intelligencer. 15 (2): 13–26. doi:10.1007/BF03024187. S2CID 122827181.
