= William Lucas Root =

American information theorist

William Lucas Root (1919 – April 22, 2007) was a noted American information theorist. As an early pioneer in the field, Root was instrumental in providing a mathematical basis for statistical communication theory.

Root was born in Iowa, receiving his bachelor's degree from Iowa State University in 1940 and master's degree from MIT in 1943, both in electrical engineering. He served as a Marine officer in World War II, in 1952 received his doctorate in mathematics from MIT, and subsequently joined Lincoln Laboratory, serving as head of its analysis group 1959–1961. From 1962 to 1987 he was Professor of Aerospace Engineering at the University of Michigan.

Root was an IEEE Fellow and received the 1986 Claude E. Shannon Award.
