= Péter Pál Pálfy =

Hungarian mathematician

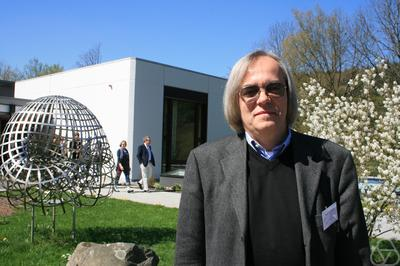
Palfy at Oberwolfach in 2011

Péter Pál Pálfy (Debrecen, 23 August 1955) is a Hungarian mathematician, working in algebra, more precisely in group theory and universal algebra. Between 2006 and 2018 he served as the director of the Alfréd Rényi Institute of Mathematics.

== Career ==
Pálfy graduated from Eötvös University, Budapest in 1978 and started working at the Alfréd Rényi Institute of Mathematics. He was deputy director of the Institute from 1991 to 1997. From 2000 to 2005 he had a full-time professorship at Eötvös University. In 2006, he returned to the Alfréd Rényi Institute of Mathematics as director holding this position until 2018 as well as a part-time professorship at Eötvös University.

Pálfy obtained his DSc degree in 1997. He was elected a corresponding member of the Hungarian Academy of Sciences in 2004 and full member in 2010.
