= Alain Glavieux =

French professor

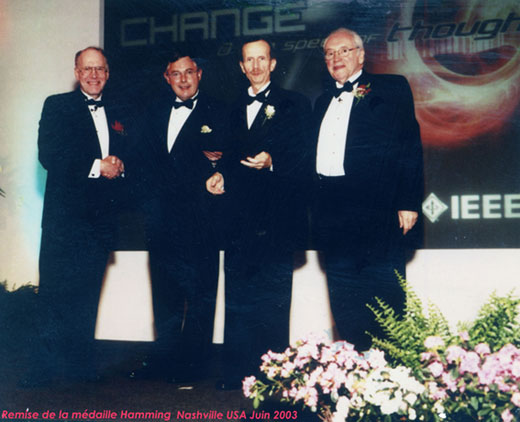
Award ceremony Hamming, Nashville Usa 2003 Glavieux is 2nd from r to l

Alain Glavieux (French: [alɛ̃ ɡlavjø]; 4 July 1949, Paris – 25 September 2004) was a French professor in electrical engineering at École Nationale Supérieure des Télécommunications de Bretagne. He was the coinventor with Claude Berrou and Punya Thitimajshima of a groundbreaking coding scheme called turbo codes.

Glavieux received the Golden Jubilee Award for Technological Innovation from the IEEE Information Theory Society together with Berrou and Thitimajshima in 1998, the IEEE Richard W. Hamming Medal together with Berrou in 2003, and the French Academy of Sciences Grand Prix France Telecom award in 2003.

He died on 25 September 2004 at the age of 55 from illness.
