= Alfréd Rényi Institute of Mathematics =

Hungarian research institute

- Rényi Alfréd Matematikai Kutatóintézet
- Established: 1950
- Field of research: mathematics
- Director: András Stipsicz
- Location: 13-15 Reáltanoda St., Budapest, 1053, Hungary; 47°29′34″N 19°3′32″E
- Affiliations: Hungarian Academy of Sciences
- Website: www.renyi.hu

The Alfréd Rényi Institute of Mathematics (Hungarian: Rényi Alfréd Matematikai Kutatóintézet) is the research institute in mathematics of the Hungarian Academy of Sciences. It was created in 1950 by Alfréd Rényi, who directed it until his death. Since its creation, the institute has been the center of mathematical research in Hungary. It received the title Centre of Excellence of the European Union (2001). The current director is András Stipsicz. The institute publishes the research journal Studia Scientiarum Mathematicarum Hungarica.

== Research divisions and research groups ==
- Algebra (head: Mátyás Domokos)
- Algebraic geometry and differential topology (head: András Némethi)
- Algebraic Logic (head: Hajnal Andréka)
- Analysis (head: András Kroó)
- Combinatorics and discrete mathematics (head: Ervin Győri)
- Geometry (head: Gábor Fejes Tóth)
- Number theory (head: János Pintz)
- Probability & statistics (head: Péter Major)
- Set theory and general topology (head: Lajos Soukup)
- Cryptology (head: Gábor Tardos)
- Financial Mathematics (Momentum research group of the Hungarian Academy of Sciences, head: Miklós Rásonyi)
- Groups and Graphs (Momentum research group of the Hungarian Academy of Sciences, European Research Council research group, head: Miklós Abért)
- Limits of Structures (Momentum research group of the Hungarian Academy of Sciences, European Research Council research group, head: Balázs Szegedy)
- Low Dimensional Topology (Momentum research group of the Hungarian Academy of Sciences, European Research Council research group, head: András Stipsicz)
- Regularity (European Research Council research group, head: Endre Szemerédi)
- Discrete and Convex Geometry (European Research Council research group, head: Imre Bárány)
- Didactics (head: Péter Juhász)

== Name ==
The institute's name originally was Applied Mathematics Institute of the HAS (Hungarian: MTA Alkalmazott Matematikai Intézete) then Mathematical Research Institute of the HAS (Hungarian: MTA Matematikai Kutatóintézete). It obtained its current name on 1 July 1999 after Alfréd Rényi, the eminent mathematician who founded the institute and was its director for 20 years.

== Some of the notable researchers ==
- Imre Bárány, combinatorialist, geometer, member of the Hungarian Academy of Sciences
- Imre Csiszár, information theorist, Shannon Award, Dobrushin Prize, member of the Hungarian Academy of Sciences
- Zoltán Füredi, combinatorialist, member of the Hungarian Academy of Sciences
- Tibor Gallai, combinatorialist
- András Hajnal, set theorist, member of the Hungarian Academy of Sciences
- István Juhász, working in set theoretical topology, member of the Hungarian Academy of Sciences
- Imre Lakatos, philosopher of mathematics and science
- Péter Major, probability theorist, member of the Hungarian Academy of Sciences
- Katalin Marton, information theorist, Shannon Award
- Péter Pál Pálfy, algebra, member of the Hungarian Academy of Sciences
- János Pintz, number theorist, AMS Cole Prize, member of the Hungarian Academy of Sciences
- Lajos Pósa, combinatorialist, educator
- László Pyber, algebra, member of the Hungarian Academy of Sciences
- Imre Z. Ruzsa, number theorist, member of the Hungarian Academy of Sciences
- Miklós Simonovits, combinatorialist, member of the Hungarian Academy of Sciences
- Vera T. Sós, combinatorialist, member of the Hungarian Academy of Sciences
- András Stipsicz, low dimensional topologist, member of the Hungarian Academy of Sciences
- Endre Szemerédi, combinatorialist, Abel Prize winner 2012, member of the Hungarian Academy of Sciences
- Gábor Tardos, combinatorialist
- Gábor Tusnády, probability theory, member of the Hungarian Academy of Sciences

== Directors ==
- Alfréd Rényi (1950–1970)
- László Fejes Tóth (1970–1982)
- András Hajnal (1982–1992)
- Domokos Szász (1993–1995)
- Gyula O. H. Katona (1996–2005)
- Péter Pál Pálfy (2006–2018)
- András Stipsicz (2019–)
