= Kano model =

Theory on customer satisfaction

The Kano model is a theory for product development and customer satisfaction developed in the 1980s by Noriaki Kano. This model provides a framework for understanding how different features of a product or service impact customer satisfaction, allowing organizations to prioritize development efforts effectively. According to the Kano Model, customer preferences are classified into five distinct categories, each representing different levels of influence on satisfaction.

== Categories ==
These categories have been translated into English using various names (delighters/exciters, satisfiers, dissatisfiers, etc.), but all refer to the original articles written by Kano.

=== Must-be Quality ===
These are the requirements that the customers expect and are taken for granted. When done well, customers are just neutral, but when done poorly, customers are very dissatisfied. Kano originally called these "Must-be's" because they are the requirements that must be included and are the price of entry into a market.

Examples: In a car, a functioning brake is a must be quality. In a hotel, providing a clean room is a basic necessity. In a call center, greeting customers is a basic necessity.

=== One-dimensional Quality ===
These attributes result in satisfaction when fulfilled and dissatisfaction when not fulfilled. These are attributes that are spoken and the ones in which companies compete. An example of this would be a milk package that is said to have ten percent more milk for the same price will result in customer satisfaction, but if it only contains six percent then the customer will feel misled and it will lead to dissatisfaction.

Examples: In a car, acceleration. Time taken to resolve a customer's issue in a call center. Waiting service at a hotel.

=== Attractive Quality ===
These attributes provide satisfaction when achieved fully, but do not cause dissatisfaction when not fulfilled. These are attributes that are not normally expected, for example, a thermometer on a package of milk showing the temperature of the milk. Since these types of attributes of quality unexpectedly delight customers, they are often unspoken.

Examples: In a car, advanced parking sensor and four wheel steering. In a callcenter, providing special offers and compensations to customers or the proactive escalation and instant resolution of their issue is an attractive feature. In a hotel, providing free food is an attractive feature.

=== Indifferent Quality ===
These attributes refer to aspects that are neither good nor bad, and they do not result in customer satisfaction or customer dissatisfaction. For example, the thickness of the wax coating on a milk carton might be key to the design and manufacturing of the carton, but consumers are not even aware of the distinction. It is beneficial to identify these attributes in the product to suppress them and diminish production costs.

Examples: In a call center, highly polite speaking and very prompt responses might not be necessary to satisfy customers and might not be appreciated by them. The same applies to hotels.

=== Reverse Quality ===
These attributes refer to a high degree of achievement resulting in dissatisfaction and to the fact that not all customers are alike. For example, some customers prefer high-tech products, while others prefer the basic model of a product and will be dissatisfied if a product has too many extra features.

Examples: In a callcenter, using a lot of jargon, using excessive pleasantries, or using excessive scripts while talking to customers might be off-putting for them. In a hotel, producing elaborate photographs of the facilities that set high expectations which are then not satisfied upon visiting can dissatisfy the customers.

== Satisfaction drivers terminology ==
Satisfaction drivers terminology
Author(s)	Driver type 1	Driver type 2	Driver type 3	Driver type 4
Herzberg et al. (1959)	Hygiene	Motivator		
Kano (1984)	Must-be	Attractive	One-dimensional	Indifferent
Cadotte and Turgeon (1988)	Dissatisfier	Satisfier	Critical	Neutral
Brandt (1988)	Minimum requirement	Value enhancing	Hybrid	Unimportant as determinant
Venkitaraman and Jaworski (1993)	Flat	Value-added	Key	Low
Brandt and Scharioth (1998)	Basic	Attractive	One-dimensional	Low impact
Llosa (1997, 1999)	Basic	Plus	Key	Secondary
Chitturi et al., (2008)	Hedonic	Utilitarian		

== Attributes' place on the model can change ==
As customer expectations change with the level of performance from competing products, attributes can move from delighter to performance need and then to basic need.

For example, in 2009, mobile phone charge would last 12 hours. As each new mobile phone generation [Fictional Scenario] improved battery life, the attribute of 12-hour battery life has shifted from delighter to less than a basic need.

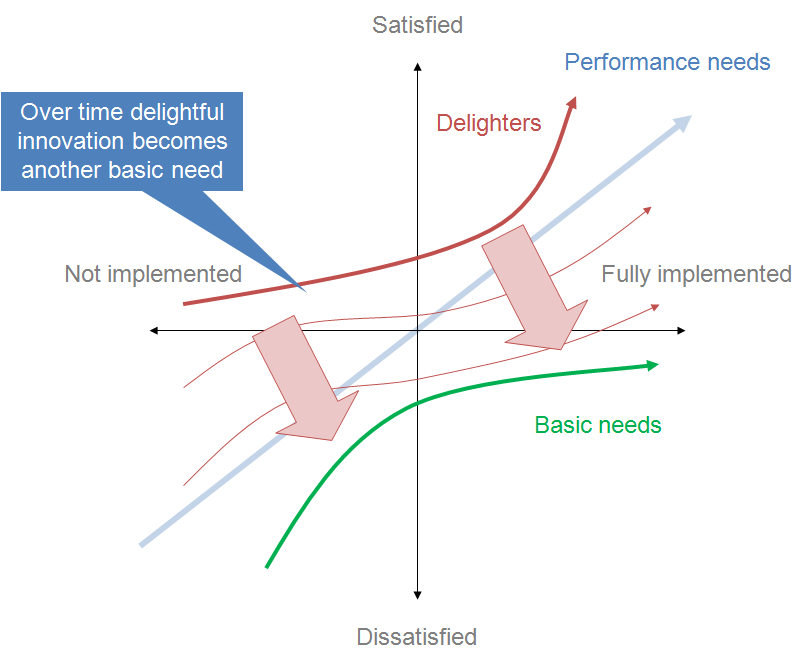

== Empirical measurement ==
Kano proposes a standardized questionnaire to measure participants' opinions in an implicit way. The participants therefore need to answer two questions for each product feature, from which one is "functional" (formulated in a positive way) and one is "dysfunctional" (formulated in a negative way).

=== Example ===
	I like it	I expect it	I am neutral	I can tolerate it	I dislike it
Functional
How would you feel if the product had ...?
How would you feel if there was more of ...?
Dysfunctional
How would you feel if the product did not have ...?
How would you feel if there was less of ...?

=== Evaluation ===
Based on the combination of answers by one participant for the functional and dysfunctional questions, one can infer the feature category.

Functional		Dysfunctional		Category
I expect it	+	I dislike it	→	Must-be
I like it	+	I dislike it	→	One-dimensional
I like it	+	I am neutral	→	Attractive
I am neutral	+	I am neutral	→	Indifferent
I dislike it	+	I expect it	→	Reverse

Illogical answers (e.g., "I like it" for both the functional and dysfunctional questions) are usually neglected or put in a special category "Questionable". Various approaches for the aggregation of categories across multiple participants have been proposed, from which the most common ones are the "Discrete analysis" and "Continuous analysis", also "Satisfaction coefficients".

=== Tools ===
The data for the Kano model typically is collected via a standardized questionnaire. The questionnaire can be on paper, collected in an interview, or conducted in an online survey. For the latter, general online survey software can be used, while there also are dedicated online tools specialized in the Kano model and its analysis.

== Uses ==
Quality function deployment (QFD) makes use of the Kano model in terms of the structuring of the comprehensive QFD matrices. Mixing Kano types in QFD matrices can lead to distortions in the customer weighting of product characteristics. For instance, mixing Must-Be product characteristics—such as cost, reliability, workmanship, safety, and technologies used in the product—in the initial House of Quality will usually result in completely filled rows and columns with high correlation values. Other Comprehensive QFD techniques using additional matrices are used to avoid such issues. Kano's model provides the insights into the dynamics of customer preferences to understand these methodology dynamics.

The Kano model offers some insight into the product attributes which are perceived to be important to customers. The purpose of the tool is to support product specification and discussion through better development of team understanding. Kano's model focuses on differentiating product features, as opposed to focusing initially on customer needs. Kano also produced a methodology for mapping consumer responses to questionnaires onto his model.

== See also ==
- Product management
- Product portfolio
- New product development
