= Toby Berger =

American information theorist (1940–2022)

Toby Berger (September 4, 1940 – May 25, 2022) was an American information theorist.

== Early life and education ==
Berger was born in New York City, to a Jewish family. He received a bachelor's degree in electrical engineering from Yale University in 1962, and doctoral degree in applied mathematics from Harvard University in 1968.

== Career ==
From 1962 to 1968 he was also a senior scientist at Raytheon. From 1968 to 2005 he taught at Cornell University, and in 2006 joined the University of Virginia. His primary interests were in information theory, random fields, communication networks, video compression, signature verification, coherent signal processing, quantum information theory, and bio-information theory.

Berger was elected a member of the National Academy of Engineering in 2006 for contributions to the theory and practice of lossy data compression. He was also an IEEE Fellow, a President of the IEEE Information Theory Society (1979), and a member of the American Association for the Advancement of Science, the American Society for Engineering Education, Sigma Xi, and Tau Beta Pi. He was the Editor-in-Chief of the IEEE Transactions on Information Theory from 1987 to 1989. He received the 2002 Claude E. Shannon Award for his contributions to information theory, and the 2011 IEEE Richard W. Hamming Medal. Berger was also a co-founder of SightSpeed, a company which originated in his lab at Cornell University, which was acquired by Logitech in 2008. In 2017 he co-founded with his former student a Wi-Fi networks technology company, Cayuga Wireless, that is based on their multiple access research for multiuser physical layers.

== Awards ==
- IEEE Richard W. Hamming Medal (2011)
- IEEE Leon K. Kirchmayer Graduate Teaching Award (2006)
- Member, National Academy of Engineering (2006)
- Claude E. Shannon Award, IEEE Information Theory Society (2002)
- IEEE Third Millennium Medal (2000)
- Frederick E. Terman Award of the American Society for Engineering Education for Outstanding Young Electrical Engineering Educator (1982)
- Fellowship, Ministry of Education, People’s Republic of China (1981)
- Japan Society for the Promotion of Science Fellowship (1980-81)
- IEEE Fellow (1977)
- Guggenheim Fellowship (1975-76)

== Death ==
Berger died on May 25, 2022, at the age of 81.

== Selected works ==
- Rate-distortion theory: A mathematical basis for data compression, Englewood Cliffs, NJ: Prentice-Hall, 1971.
- Digital Compression for Multimedia, San Francisco, CA: Morgan Kaufmann, 1998.
