= Context tree weighting =

The context tree weighting method (CTW) is a lossless compression and prediction algorithm by Willems, Shtarkov & Tjalkens 1995. The CTW algorithm is among the very few such algorithms that offer both theoretical guarantees and good practical performance (see, e.g. Begleiter, El-Yaniv & Yona 2004). The CTW algorithm is an “ensemble method”, mixing the predictions of many underlying variable order Markov models, where each such model is constructed using zero-order conditional probability estimators.
