= Claude E. Shannon Award =

IEEE award

- Awarded for: To honor consistent and profound contributions to the field of information theory.
- Sponsored by: IEEE Information Theory Society
- Country: United States
- Rewards: The award consists of a bronze medal, certificate, and honorarium.
- First award: 1973
- Website: Claude E. Shannon Award

The Claude E. Shannon Award of the IEEE Information Theory Society was created to honor consistent and profound contributions to the field of information theory. Each Shannon Award winner is expected to present a Shannon Lecture at the following IEEE International Symposium on Information Theory. It is a prestigious prize in information theory, covering technical contributions at the intersection of mathematics, communication engineering, and theoretical computer science. It is the highest honor given by the IEEE Information Theory Society and is also regarded as the highest award in the entire field of information theory.

It is named for Claude E. Shannon, who was also the first recipient in 1973.

== Recipients ==
The following people have received the Claude E. Shannon Award:

- 1973 – Claude E. Shannon
- 1974 – David S. Slepian
- 1976 – Robert M. Fano
- 1977 – Peter Elias
- 1978 – Mark Semenovich Pinsker
- 1979 – Jacob Wolfowitz
- 1981 – W. Wesley Peterson
- 1982 – Irving S. Reed
- 1983 – Robert G. Gallager
- 1985 – Solomon W. Golomb
- 1986 – William Lucas Root
- 1988 – James Massey
- 1990 – Thomas M. Cover
- 1991 – Andrew Viterbi
- 1993 – Elwyn Berlekamp
- 1994 – Aaron D. Wyner
- 1995 – George David Forney
- 1996 – Imre Csiszár
- 1997 – Jacob Ziv
- 1998 – Neil Sloane
- 1999 – Tadao Kasami
- 2000 – Thomas Kailath
- 2001 – Jack Keil Wolf
- 2002 – Toby Berger
- 2003 – Lloyd R. Welch
- 2004 – Robert McEliece
- 2005 – Richard Blahut
- 2006 – Rudolf Ahlswede
- 2007 – Sergio Verdú
- 2008 – Robert M. Gray
- 2009 – Jorma Rissanen
- 2010 – Te Sun Han
- 2011 – Shlomo Shamai (Shitz)
- 2012 – Abbas El Gamal
- 2013 – Katalin Marton
- 2014 – János Körner
- 2015 – Robert Calderbank
- 2016 – Alexander Holevo
- 2017 – David Tse
- 2018 – Gottfried Ungerboeck
- 2019 – Erdal Arıkan
- 2020 – Charles Bennett
- 2021 – Alon Orlitsky
- 2022 – Raymond W. Yeung
- 2023 – Rüdiger Urbanke
- 2024 – Andrew Barron
- 2025 – Peter Shor
- 2026 – Frans Willems
- 2027 – Andrea Goldsmith

== See also ==
- List of computer science awards
