= Imre Csiszár =

Hungarian mathematician

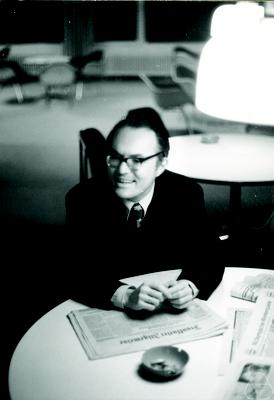
Imre Csiszár in 1976

Imre Csiszár (born 7 February 1938) is a Hungarian mathematician known for his contributions to information theory and probability theory. In 1996, he received the Claude E. Shannon Award, one of the highest honours in information theory.

== Early life and education ==
Csiszár was born in Miskolc, Hungary. He developed an interest in mathematics during middle school, influenced in part by his father, a forest engineer who applied mathematical methods in his work.

He studied mathematics at Eötvös Loránd University in Budapest, receiving his diploma in 1961. He earned his PhD in 1967 and the Doctor of Mathematical Sciences degree in 1977.

== Career and research ==
Csiszár was influenced by mathematician Alfréd Rényi, particularly in the field of probability theory. He has been associated with the Alfréd Rényi Institute of Mathematics of the Hungarian Academy of Sciences since 1961, where he has held several positions, including head of the Information Theory Group and head of the Stochastics Department.

He has also served as a professor of mathematics at Eötvös Loránd University. Throughout his career, he has held visiting positions at institutions including Bielefeld University, the University of Maryland, College Park, Stanford University, the University of Virginia, the University of Tokyo, and Nippon Telegraph and Telephone.

== Honours and awards ==
Csiszár is a Fellow of the IEEE and a member of several scientific societies, including the Bernoulli Society for Mathematical Statistics and Probability.

His awards include:

- Claude E. Shannon Award (1996)
- IEEE Richard W. Hamming Medal (2015)
- IEEE Information Theory Society Paper Award (1988)
- Academy Award for Interdisciplinary Research of the Hungarian Academy of Sciences (1989)

== Publications ==
- With János Körner: Information Theory: Coding Theorems for Discrete Memoryless Systems. Academic Press, 1981; 2nd edition, Cambridge University Press, 2011.
- With Paul C. Shields: Information Theory and Statistics: A Tutorial. Now Publishers, 2004.

== Personal life ==
Csiszár is married and has four children.
