= István Juhász (mathematician) =

Hungarian mathematician

István Juhász (born 2 July 1943, Budapest) is a Hungarian mathematician, working in set theory. He works at the Rényi Mathematical Institute of the Hungarian Academy of Sciences.

== Career ==
Juhász graduated from Eötvös University, Budapest in 1966 and worked there until 1974 when he moved to the Alfréd Rényi Institute of Mathematics of the Hungarian Academy of Sciences, where he is currently a professor emeritus.

Juhász obtained a DSc degree in 1977 from the Academy and he was elected a corresponding member of the Hungarian Academy of Sciences (2007). He was the president of the European Set Theory Society for the period 2015–2018. He is a member of the editorial board of the journals Studia Scientiarum Mathematicarum and Topology and its Applications.
