= Link adaptation =

Link adaptation, comprising adaptive modulation and coding (AMC) and others, is a term used in wireless communications to denote the matching of the modulation, coding and other signal and protocol parameters to the conditions on the radio link (e.g. the pathloss, the interference due to signals coming from other transmitters, the sensitivity of the receiver, the available transmitter power margin, etc.). For example, WiMAX uses a rate adaptation algorithm that adapts the modulation and coding scheme (MCS) according to the quality of the radio channel, and thus the bit rate and robustness of data transmission. The process of link adaptation is a dynamic one and the signal and protocol parameters change as the radio link conditions change—for example in High-Speed Downlink Packet Access (HSDPA) in Universal Mobile Telecommunications System (UMTS) this can take place every 2 ms.

Adaptive modulation systems invariably require some channel state information at the transmitter. This could be acquired in time-division duplex systems by assuming the channel from the transmitter to the receiver is approximately the same as the channel from the receiver to the transmitter. Alternatively, the channel knowledge can also be directly measured at the receiver, and fed back to the transmitter. Adaptive modulation systems improve rate of transmission, and/or bit error rates, by exploiting the channel state information that is present at the transmitter. Especially over fading channels which model Wireless propagation environments, adaptive modulation systems exhibit great performance enhancements compared to systems that do not exploit channel knowledge at the transmitter.

== Example ==
In HSDPA link adaptation is performed by:

- Choice of modulation type—the link can employ QPSK for noisy channels and 16QAM for clearer channels. The former is more robust and can tolerate higher levels of interference but has lower spectral efficiency, which means it may transmit at a lower bit rate for a given bandwidth. The latter has double the spectral efficiency, but is more prone to errors due to interference and noise hence it requires stronger forward error correction (FEC) coding which in turn means more redundant bits and lower information bit rate;
- Choice of FEC code rate—the FEC code used has a rate of 1/3, but it can be varied effectively by bit puncturing and hybrid automatic repeat request (HARQ) with incremental redundancy. When the radio link conditions are good more bits are punctured and the information bit rate is increased. In poor link conditions all redundant bits are transmitted and the information bit rate drops. In very bad link conditions retransmissions occur due to HARQ which ensures correct reception of the sent information but further decreases the bit rate.

Thus HSDPA adapts to achieve very high bit rates, of the order of 14 megabit/sec, on clear channels using 16-QAM and close to 1/1 coding rate. On noisy channels HSDPA adapts to provide reliable communications using QPSK and 1/3 coding rate but the information bit rate drops to about 2.4 megabit/sec. This adaptation is performed up to 500 times per second.

== See also ==
- Cognitive radio
- Cliff effect
- Dirty paper coding
- IEEE 802.11n-2009 § Data rates
- IEEE 802.11ac § Data rates and speed
- IEEE 802.11ax § Rate set
- Hierarchical modulation
- Radio resource management
