= Error floor =

Phenomenon in error correcting codes

The error floor is a phenomenon encountered in modern iterated sparse graph-based error correcting codes like LDPC codes and turbo codes. When the bit error ratio (BER) is plotted for conventional codes like Reed–Solomon codes under algebraic decoding or for convolutional codes under Viterbi decoding, the BER steadily decreases in the form of a curve as the SNR condition becomes better. For LDPC codes and turbo codes there is a point after which the curve does not fall as quickly as before, in other words, there is a region in which performance flattens. This region is called the error floor region. The region just before the sudden drop in performance is called the waterfall region.

Error floors are usually attributed to low-weight codewords (in the case of Turbo codes) and trapping sets or near-codewords (in the case of LDPC codes).
