= EXIT chart =

An example EXIT chart showing two components "right" and "left" and an example decoding (blue)

An extrinsic information transfer chart, commonly called an EXIT chart, is a technique to aid the construction of good iteratively-decoded error-correcting codes (in particular low-density parity-check (LDPC) codes and Turbo codes).

EXIT charts were developed by Stephan ten Brink, building on the concept of extrinsic information developed in the Turbo coding community. An EXIT chart includes the response of elements of decoder (for example a convolutional decoder of a Turbo code, the LDPC parity-check nodes or the LDPC variable nodes). The response can either be seen as extrinsic information or a representation of the messages in belief propagation.

If there are two components which exchange messages, the behaviour of the decoder can be plotted on a two-dimensional chart. One component is plotted with its input on the horizontal axis and its output on the vertical axis. The other component is plotted with its input on the vertical axis and its output on the horizontal axis. The decoding path followed is found by stepping between the two curves. For a successful decoding, there must be a clear swath between the curves so that iterative decoding can proceed from 0 bits of extrinsic information to 1 bit of extrinsic information.

A key assumption is that the messages to and from an element of the decoder can be described by a single number, the extrinsic information. This is true when decoding codes from a binary erasure channel but otherwise the messages are often samples from a Gaussian distribution with the correct extrinsic information. The other key assumption is that the messages are independent (equivalent to an infinite block-size code without local structure between the components)

To make an optimal code, the two transfer curves need to lie close to each other. This observation is supported by the theoretical result that for capacity to be reached for a code over a binary-erasure channel there must be no area between the curves and also by the insight that a large number of iterations are required for information to be spread throughout all bits of a code.
