= Soft-decision decoder =

In information theory, a soft-decision decoder is a kind of decoding method – a class of algorithm used to decode data that has been encoded with an error correcting code. Whereas a hard-decision decoder operates on data that take on a fixed set of possible values (typically 0 or 1 in a binary code), the inputs to a soft-decision decoder may take on a whole range of values in-between. This extra information indicates the reliability of each input data point, and is used to form better estimates of the original data. Therefore, a soft-decision decoder will typically perform better in the presence of corrupted data than its hard-decision counterpart.

Soft-decision decoders are often used in Viterbi decoders and turbo code decoders.

== See also ==
- Forward error correction
- Soft-in soft-out decoder
