= Cliff effect =

Sudden loss of digital signal reception

In telecommunications, the (digital) cliff effect or brick-wall effect is a sudden loss of digital signal reception. Unlike analog signals, which gradually fade when signal strength decreases or electromagnetic interference or multipath increases, a digital signal provides data which is either perfect or non-existent at the receiving end. It is named for a graph of reception quality versus signal quality, where the digital signal "falls off a cliff" instead of having a gradual rolloff. This is an example of an EXIT chart.

The phenomenon is primarily seen in broadcasting, where signal strength is liable to vary, rather than in recorded media, which generally have a good signal. However, it may be seen in significantly damaged media that is at the edge of readability.

== Broadcasting ==
=== Digital television ===
This effect can most easily be seen on digital television, including both satellite TV and over-the-air terrestrial TV. While forward error correction is applied to the broadcast, when a minimum threshold of signal quality (a maximum bit error rate) is reached it is no longer enough for the decoder to recover. The picture may break up (macroblocking), lock on a freeze frame, or go blank. Causes include rain fade or solar transit on satellites, and temperature inversions and other weather or atmospheric conditions causing anomalous propagation on the ground.

Three particular issues particularly manifest the cliff effect. Firstly, anomalous conditions will cause occasional signal degradation. Secondly, if one is located in a fringe area, where the antenna is just barely strong enough to receive the signal, then usual variation in signal quality will cause relatively frequent signal degradation, and a very small change in overall signal quality can have a dramatic impact on the frequency of signal degradation – one incident per hour (not significantly affecting watchability) versus problems every few seconds or continuous problems. Thirdly, in some cases, where the signal is beyond the cliff (in unwatchable territory), viewers who were once able to receive a degraded signal from analog stations will find after digital transition that there is no available signal in rural, fringe or mountainous regions.

The cliff effect is a particularly serious issue for mobile TV, as signal quality may vary significantly, particularly if the receiver is moving rapidly, as in a car.

Hierarchical modulation and coding can provide a compromise by supporting two or more streams with different robustness parameters and allowing receivers to scale back to a lower definition (usually from HDTV to SDTV, or possibly from SDTV to LDTV) before dropping out completely. Two-level hierarchical modulation is supported in principle by the European DVB-T digital terrestrial television standard. However, layered source coding, such as provided by Scalable Video Coding, is not supported.

=== Digital radio ===
HD Radio broadcasting, officially used only in the United States, is one system designed to have an analog fallback. Digital radio receivers are designed to immediately switch to the analog signal upon losing a lock on digital, but only as long as the tuned station operates in hybrid digital mode (the official meaning of "HD"). In the proposed all-digital mode, there is no analog to fall back to at the edge of the digital cliff. This applies only to the main channel simulcast, and not to any subchannels, because they have nothing to fall back to. It is also important for the station's broadcast engineer to make sure that the audio signal is synchronized between analog and digital, or the cliff effect will still cause a jump slightly forward or backward in the radio program.

== Mobile phones ==
The cliff effect is also heard on mobile phones, where one or both sides of the conversation may break up, possibly resulting in a dropped call. Other forms of digital radio also suffer from this.

== See also ==
- Digital television transition
- Link adaptation
