= Joachim Hagenauer =

German information theorist and academic (1941-2026)

Joachim Hagenauer (29 July 1941 – 16 January 2026) was a German information theorist and academic who was professor emeritus at Technical University of Munich. He pioneered the use of soft bits (see Soft output Viterbi algorithm), a coding theory technique that contributes to the high performance of the turbo codes.

Hagenauer's work enabled the advancement of turbo coding and led to a significant improvement in channel coding for digital communications and storage. His works have been applied to digital receiver designs, satellite transmissions and other facets of telecommunications.

== Life and career ==
Hagenauer received his doctorate in 1974 from Darmstadt University of Technology where he also served as an assistant professor. In 1990 he was appointed a director of the Institute for Communication Technology at the German Aerospace Center DLR in Oberpfaffenhofen. In 1993 he became the Chair of the University of Technology's Communications Technology department in Munich, Germany.

He was also active at the IEEE Information Theory Society.

In 1992, Hagenauer was elevated to the grade of IEEE fellow for contribution to the application of convolutional codes to mobile radio and satellite communications.

He was awarded the Erich Regener and Otto Lilienthal Prizes from the German Aerospace Association, and the Armstrong Award from the IEEE Communications Society, and was also elected to the Bavarian Academy of Science. In 2003, he received the IEEE Alexander Graham Bell Medal for meritorious achievements in telecommunications.

Hagenauer died on 16 January 2026, at the age of 84.

== See also ==
- Google scholar profile

Awards
Preceded by Tsuneo Nakahara	IEEE Alexander Graham Bell Medal; 2003	Succeeded by Not awarded (Jim K. Omura, 2005)
