= Tsuneo Nakahara =

Tsuneo Nakahara (中原 恒雄, Nakahara Tsuneo; 1930 in Tokushima Prefecture – January 2016) was a Japanese communications engineer, executive advisor to the CEO of Sumitomo Electric. He was one of the main researchers contributing to the development of optical fiber technology.

He earned his B.E. in 1953 and his Ph.D. in 1961, both in electrical engineering, from the University of Tokyo. He did his post-doc at Polytechnic Institute of New York University. He was a foreign associate of the US National Academy of Engineering and a member of the Board of Trustees of Polytechnic Institute of New York University.

In 1983, Tsuneo Nakahara became fellow of the IEEE for contributions to the development of microwave transmission lines, traffic control systems, and fiber optics.

Nakahara was an IEEE Life Fellow and served in a number of positions. In 2002, he received the IEEE Alexander Graham Bell Medal.

== Notes ==
Awards
Preceded by Not awarded (Vladimir Kotelnikov, 2000)	IEEE Alexander Graham Bell Medal; 2002	Succeeded by Joachim Hagenauer
