= Soft-in soft-out decoder =

Type of soft-decision decoder

A soft-in soft-out decoder (SISO decoder) is a type of soft-decision decoder used with error correcting codes. "Soft-in" refers to the fact that the incoming data may take on values other than 0 or 1, in order to indicate reliability. "Soft-out" refers to the fact that each bit in the decoded output also takes on a value indicating reliability. Typically, the soft output is used as the soft input to an outer decoder in a system using concatenated codes, or to modify the input to a further decoding iteration such as in the decoding of turbo codes.

Examples include the BCJR algorithm and the soft output Viterbi algorithm.

== See also ==
- Decoding methods
- Error detection and correction
- Forward error correction
