= J. J. Stiffler =

American electrical engineer, computer scientist, and entrepreneur (1934–2019)

Jack Justin Stiffler (1934–2019) was an American electrical engineer, computer scientist and entrepreneur, a Fellow of the Institute of Electrical and Electronics Engineers who made key contributions in the areas of communications (especially coding theory) and fault-tolerant computing.

== Education and career ==
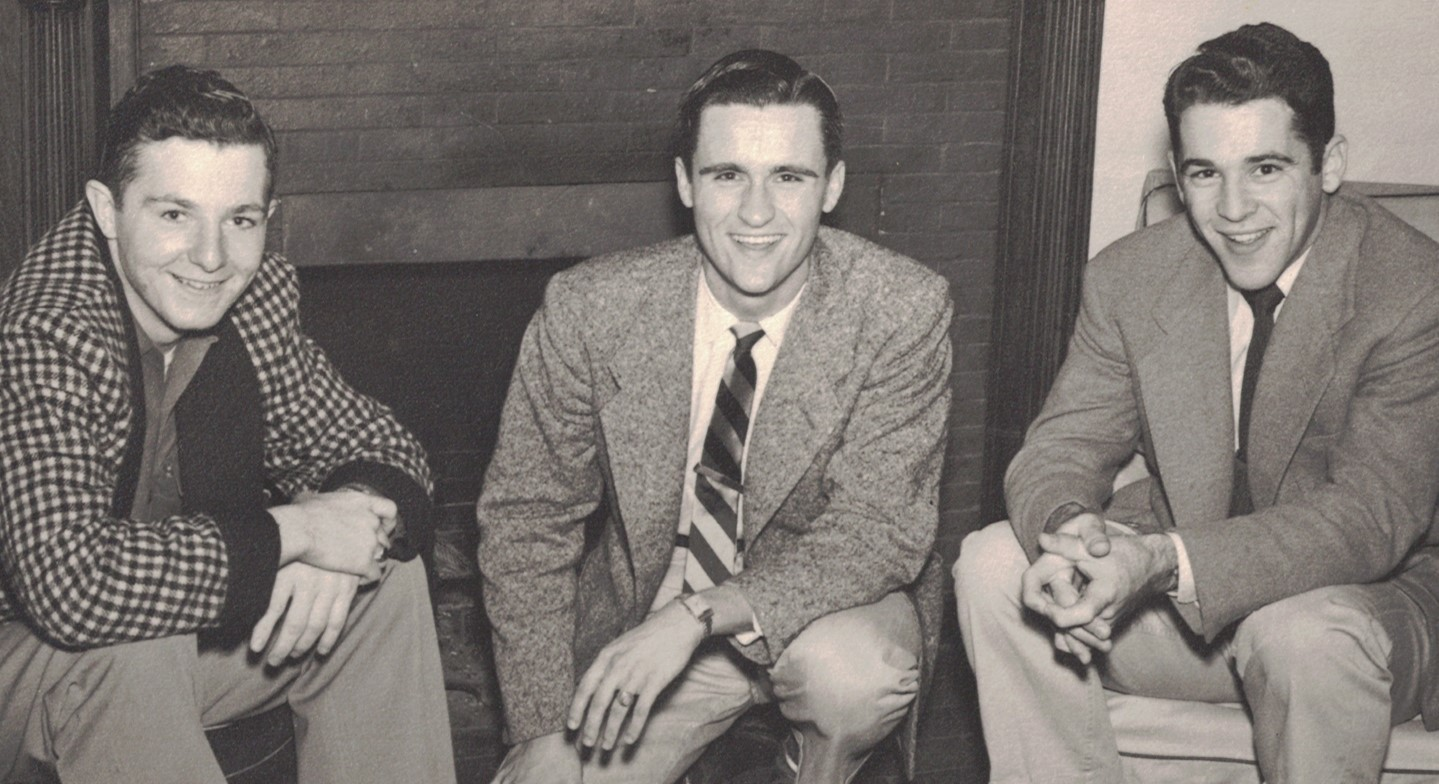
Stiffler (right) with his college roommates

Stiffler was born May 22, 1934, in Mitchellville, Iowa, and graduated from Mitchellville High School. In 1952 he entered Harvard College, where he lived in Adams House, and graduated in 1956 with an AB magna cum laude in physics. He immediately moved to Los Angeles and joined the research department of Hughes Aircraft Company. He received an MS in electrical engineering from the California Institute of Technology in 1957, and after a year at the Sorbonne on a Fulbright scholarship returned to Caltech, where he completed his PhD in 1962. He was a member of Phi Beta Kappa and Sigma Xi.

In 1959 he began part-time work in the Communications Systems Research Section of the Jet Propulsion Laboratory in Pasadena, California, and in 1961 he became a full-time Member of the Technical Staff there. In 1967 he became a Consulting Engineer with the Space and Information Systems Division of Raytheon Company in Sudbury, Massachusetts, where he worked on advanced communications systems.

In 1981 he founded Sequoia Systems Incorporated in Marlborough, Massachusetts, which produced fault-tolerant computer systems, specialized for transaction processing, using a tightly coupled architecture of his design. Nine years later the company began trading on the NASDAQ exchange.

Stiffler died March 24, 2019, in Watsonville, California.

== Research ==
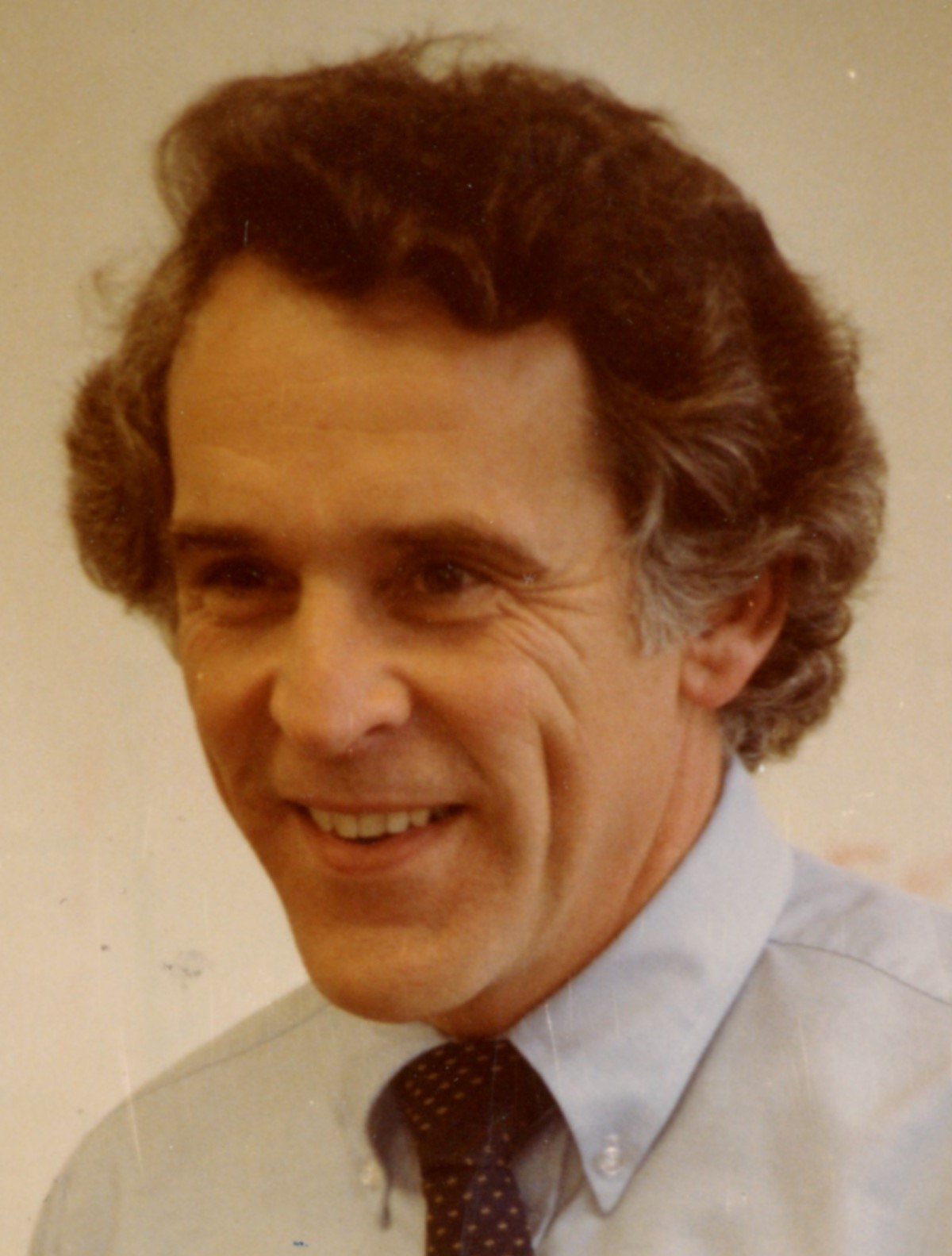
Stiffler in the 1980s

Stiffler was author or coauthor of numerous papers and books, and was awarded several hundred patents. His thesis, "Self-synchronizing binary telemetry codes", supervised by Solomon Golomb, combined the ideas of binary orthogonal codes (in which codewords are completely uncorrelated with one other) and self-synchronizing codes (in which there is no ambiguity about the positions of the boundaries between code words); he found constructions of self-synchronizing binary orthogonal codes for all codeword lengths greater than or equal to four, and proved nonexistence for all shorter lengths.

In 1964 he developed the puncturing technique (and proved the Solomon–Stiffler bound) with Gustave Solomon, and coauthored Digital Communications with Space Applications with Golomb, Andrew Viterbi and two others. His 1971 book Theory of Synchronous Communications grew out of NASA's need for highly power-efficient synchronous serial communication during data transmissions for its deep space program; a review called it "unparalleled in its comprehensive treatment of the synchronization problems of time-discrete communications" and "a landmark in the theoretical development" of the subject.

In 1971 he edited a special issue, on error correcting codes, of IEEE Transactions on Communication Technology, and in 1980 he edited a special issue of IEEE Transactions on Computers surveying fault-tolerant computing.

In 1975 he was made a Fellow of the IEEE, a distinction reserved for IEEE members with "extraordinary record[s] of accomplishment".
