= Sparse graph code =

Code represented by sparse graph

A sparse graph code is a code which is represented by a sparse graph.

Any linear code can be represented as a graph, where there are two sets of nodes - a set representing the transmitted bits and another set representing the constraints that the transmitted bits have to satisfy. The state of the art classical error-correcting codes are based on sparse graphs, achieving close to the Shannon limit. The archetypal sparse-graph codes are Gallager's low-density parity-check codes.
