= Code rate =

Non-redundant proportion of an error correction code data stream

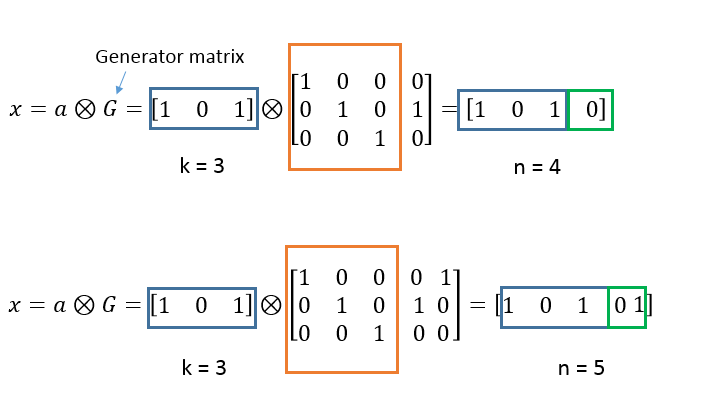
Different code rates (Hamming code)

In telecommunication and information theory, the code rate (or information rate) of a forward error correction code is the proportion of the data-stream that is useful (non-redundant). That is, if the code rate is $k/n$, for every k bits of useful information, the coder generates a total of n bits of data, of which $n-k$ are redundant.

If R is the gross bit rate or data signalling rate (inclusive of redundant error coding), the net bit rate (the useful bit rate exclusive of error correction codes) is $\leq R \cdot k/n$.

For example: The code rate of a convolutional code will typically be 1/2, 2/3, 3/4, 5/6, 7/8, etc., corresponding to one redundant bit inserted after every single, second, third, etc., bit. The code rate of the octet oriented Reed Solomon block code denoted RS(204,188) is 188/204, meaning that 204 − 188 = 16 redundant octets (or bytes) are added to each block of 188 octets of useful information.

A few error correction codes do not have a fixed code rate—rateless erasure codes.

Note that bit/s is a more widespread unit of measurement for the information rate, implying that it is synonymous with net bit rate or useful bit rate exclusive of error-correction codes.

== See also ==
- Entropy rate
- Information rate
- Punctured code
