= Punctured code =

Signal coding technique

In coding theory, puncturing is the process of removing some of the parity bits after encoding with an error-correction code. This has the same effect as encoding with an error-correction code with a higher rate, or less redundancy. However, with puncturing the same decoder can be used regardless of how many bits have been punctured, thus puncturing considerably increases the flexibility of the system without significantly increasing its complexity.

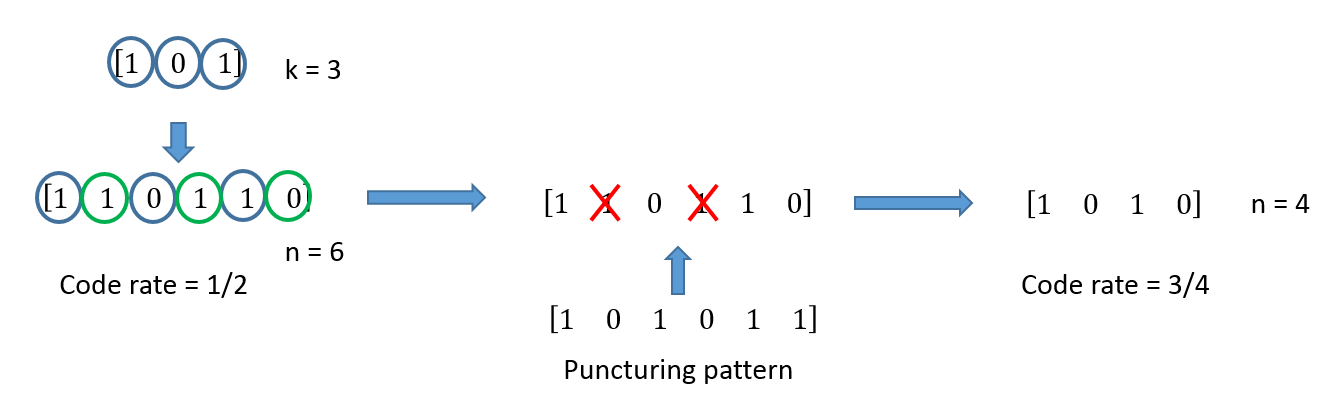
Short illustration of the puncturing procedure

A pre-defined pattern of puncturing is used in an encoder, in some cases. Then, the inverse operation, known as depuncturing, is implemented by the decoder.

Puncturing is used in UMTS during the rate matching process. It is also used in Wi-Fi, Wi-SUN, GPRS, EDGE, DVB-T and DAB, as well as in the DRM Standards.

Puncturing is often used with the Viterbi algorithm in coding systems.

During Radio Resource Control (RRC) Connection set procedure, during sending NBAP radio link setup message the uplink puncturing limit will send to NODE B, along with U/L spreading factor & U/L scrambling code.

Puncturing was introduced by Gustave Solomon and J. J. Stiffler in 1964.

== See also ==
- Singleton bound, an upper bound in coding theory
