= Amin Shokrollahi =

Iranian mathematician

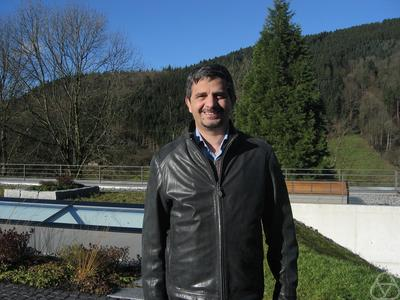
- Shokrollahi at Oberwolfach in 2007
- Born: Mohammad Amin Shokrollahi; 1964 (age 61–62); Tehran, Tehran Province, Iran
- Education: University of Karlsruhe
- Known for: Raptor Codes, Tornado Codes, Chord Signaling
- Awards: IEEE IT Best Paper Award (2002) IEEE Eric E. Sumner Award (2007) Communication Society and Information Theory Society Best Paper Award (2007) IEEE Hamming Medal (2012) ISSCC Jan van Vessem Award (2014) Mustafa Award (2017)
- Scientific career
- Fields: Coding theory
- Workplaces: Professor at EPFL
- Thesis: Beiträge zur Codierungs- und Komplexitätstheorie mittels algebraischer Funktionenkörper (1991)
- Doctoral advisor: Michael Clausen

Amin Shokrollahi (born 1964) is a German-Iranian mathematician who has worked on a variety of topics including coding theory and algebraic complexity theory. He is best known for his work on iterative decoding of graph based codes for which he received the IEEE Information Theory Paper Award of 2002 (together with Michael Luby, Michael Mitzenmacher, and Daniel Spielman, as well as Tom Richardson and Ruediger Urbanke). He is one of the inventors of a modern class of practical erasure codes known as tornado codes, and the principal developer of raptor codes, which belong to a class of rateless erasure codes known as Fountain codes. In connection with the work on these codes, he received the IEEE Eric E. Sumner Award in 2007 together with Michael Luby "for bridging mathematics, Internet design and mobile broadcasting as well as successful standardization" and the IEEE Richard W. Hamming Medal in 2012 together with Michael Luby "for the conception, development, and analysis of practical rateless codes". He also received the 2007 joint Communication Society and Information Theory Society best paper award as well as the 2017 Mustafa Prize for his work on raptor codes.

He is the principal inventor of Chordal Codes, a new class of codes specifically designed for communication on electrical wires between chips. In 2011 he founded the company Kandou Bus dedicated to commercialization of the concept of Chordal Codes. The first implementation, transmitting data on 8 correlated wires and implemented in a 40 nm process, received the Jan Van Vessem Award for best European Paper at the International Solid-State Circuits Conference (ISSCC) 2014.
