= Michael Luby =

Information theorist and cryptographer

Michael George Luby
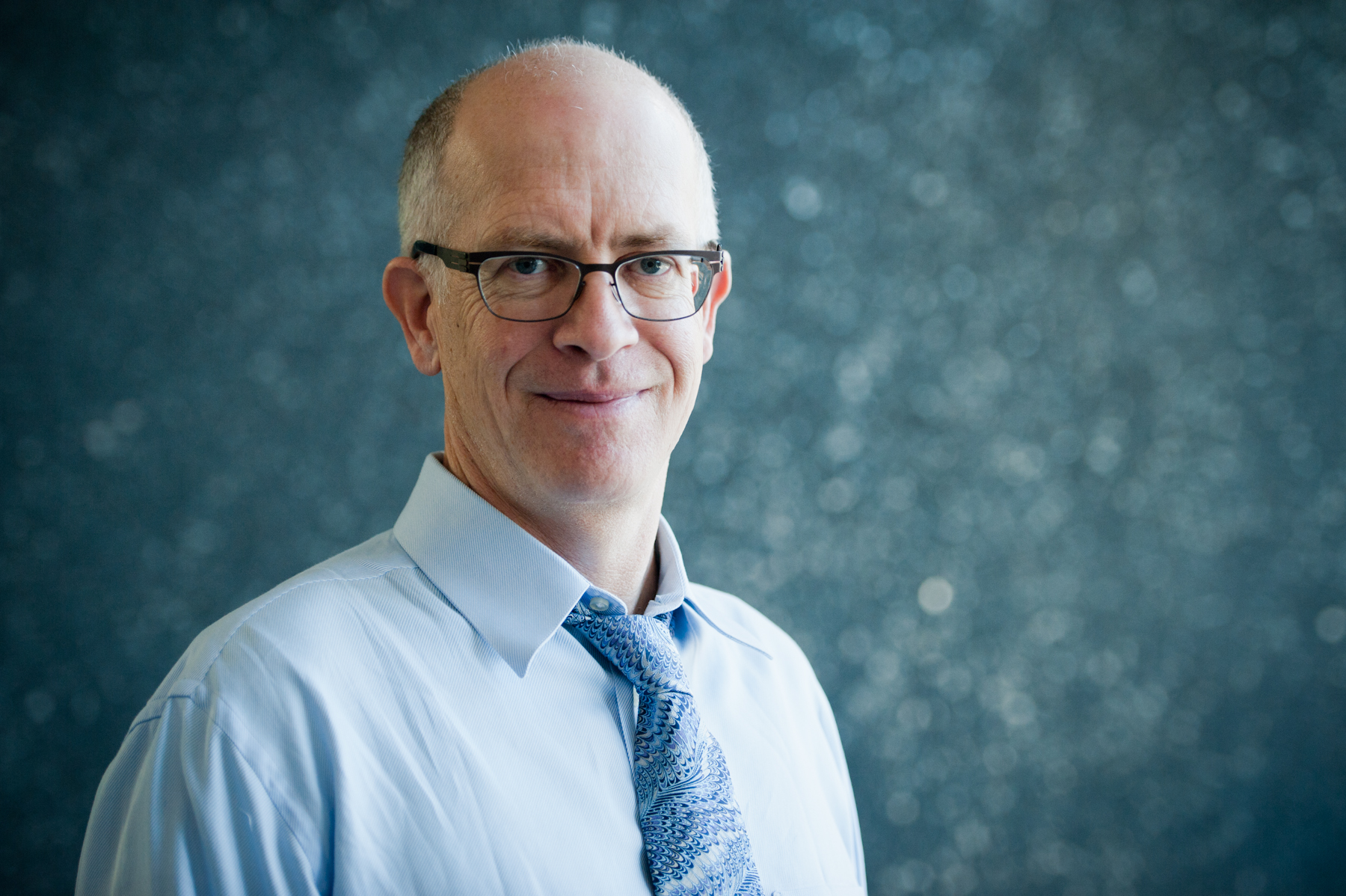
- Education: Massachusetts Institute of Technology (BS); University of California, Berkeley (PhD)
- Known for: Tornado code; LT code; Feistel cipher
- Awards: IEEE Richard W. Hamming Medal; Paris Kanellakis Theory and Practice Award; IEEE Eric E. Sumner Award; National Academy of Engineering; Fellow of the Association for Computing Machinery; Fellow of the IEEE
- Scientific career
- Fields: Mathematics; Computer science
- Workplaces: BitRipple; Qualcomm; Digital Fountain; International Computer Science Institute; University of Toronto
- Thesis: Monte-Carlo Methods for Estimating System Reliability (1983)
- Doctoral advisor: Richard Karp

Michael George Luby is a mathematician and computer scientist, CTO of BitRipple, senior research scientist at the International Computer Science Institute (ICSI), former VP Technology at Qualcomm, co-founder and former chief technology officer of Digital Fountain. In coding theory he is known for leading the invention of the Tornado codes and the LT codes. In cryptography he is known for his contributions showing that any one-way function can be used as the basis for private cryptography, and for his analysis, in collaboration with Charles Rackoff, of the Feistel cipher construction. His distributed algorithm to find a maximal independent set in a computer network has also been influential.

Luby received his B.Sc. in mathematics from Massachusetts Institute of Technology in 1975. In 1983 he was awarded a Ph.D. in computer science from University of California, Berkeley. In 1996–1997, while at the ICSI, he led the team that invented Tornado codes. These were the first LDPC codes based on an irregular degree design that has proved crucial to all later good LDPC code designs, which provably achieve channel capacity for the erasure channel, and which have linear time encoding and decoding algorithms. In 1998 Luby left ICSI to found the Digital Fountain company, and shortly thereafter in 1998 he invented the LT codes, the first practical fountain codes. Qualcomm acquired Digital Fountain in 2009.

== Awards ==
Luby's publications have won the 2002 IEEE Information Theory Society Information Theory Paper Award for leading the design and analysis of the first irregular LDPC error-correcting codes, the 2003 SIAM Outstanding Paper Prize for the seminal paper showing how to construct a cryptographically unbreakable pseudo-random generator from any one-way function, and the 2009 ACM SIGCOMM Test of Time Award.

In 2016 he was awarded the ACM Edsger W. Dijkstra Prize in Distributed Computing; the prize is given "for outstanding papers on the principles of distributed computing, whose significance and impact on the theory and/or practice of distributed computing have been evident for at least a decade", and was awarded to Luby for his work on parallel algorithms for maximal independent sets.

Luby won the 2007 IEEE Eric E. Sumner Award together with Amin Shokrollahi "for bridging mathematics, Internet design and mobile broadcasting as well as successful standardization". He was given the 2012 IEEE Richard W. Hamming Medal together with Amin Shokrollahi "for the conception, development, and analysis of practical rateless codes". In 2015, he won the ACM Paris Kanellakis Theory and Practice Award "for groundbreaking contributions to erasure correcting codes, which are essential for improving the quality of video transmission over a variety of networks."

Luby was elected to the National Academy of Engineering in 2014, "for contributions to coding theory including the inception of rateless codes". In 2015 he was elected as a Fellow of the Association for Computing Machinery. Luby was elected as a Fellow of the IEEE in 2009.

== Selected publications ==
- Michael Luby (2021). "Repair rate lower bounds for distributed storage". IEEE Transactions on Information Theory. 67 (9): 1. arXiv:2002.07904. doi:10.1109/TIT.2021.3052488. S2CID 211171523.
- John Byers and Mike Luby (2020). "Liquid Data Networking". Proceedings of the 7th ACM Conference on Information-Centric Networking. pp. 129–135. doi:10.1145/3405656.3418710. ISBN 978-1-4503-8040-9. S2CID 221565728.
- M. Luby, R. Padovani, T. Richardson, L. Minder, P. Aggarwal (2019). "Liquid Cloud Storage". ACM Transactions on Storage. 15 (1): 1–49. arXiv:1705.07983. doi:10.1145/3281276. S2CID 738764.
- M. Luby, A. Shokrollahi, M. Watson, T. Stockhammer, L. Minder (2011). "RaptorQ Forward Error Correction Scheme for Object Delivery" (RFC 6330).
- Amin Shokrollahi and Michael Luby (2011). "Raptor Codes". Foundations and Trends in Communications and Information Theory. 6 (3–4). Now Publishers: 213–322. doi:10.1561/0100000060. S2CID 1731099.
- J. Byers, M. Luby, M. Mitzenmacher, A. Rege (1998). "A digital fountain approach to reliable distribution of bulk data". ACM SIGCOMM (Special Interest Group on Data Communications): 56–67.
- Luby, Michael (2002). "LT codes". The 43rd Annual IEEE Symposium on Foundations of Computer Science, 2002. Proceedings. pp. 271–282. doi:10.1109/sfcs.2002.1181950. ISBN 978-0-7695-1822-0. S2CID 1861068.
- J. Hastad, R. Impagliazzo, L. Levin, M. Luby (1999). "A Pseudorandom generator from any one-way function". SIAM Journal on Computing. 28 (4): 1364–1396. doi:10.1137/S0097539793244708.
- Luby, Michael (1996). "Pseudorandomness and Cryptographic Applications". Princeton Computer Science Notes, David R. Hanson and Robert E. Tarjan, Editors. Princeton University Press.
- R. Karp, M. Luby, N. Madras (1989). "Monte-Carlo Approximation Algorithms for Enumeration Problems". J. Algorithms. 10 (3): 429–448. doi:10.1016/0196-6774(89)90038-2.
- M. Luby, C. Rackoff (1988). "How to Construct Pseudorandom Permutations from Pseudorandom Functions". SIAM Journal on Computing. 17 (2): 1364–1396. doi:10.1137/0217022.
- Luby, Michael (1986). "A Simple Parallel Algorithm for the Maximal Independent Set Problem". SIAM Journal on Computing. 15 (4): 1036–1053. doi:10.1137/0215074.
