= Gnu code =

Family of quantum error correcting codes

In quantum information, the gnu code refers to a particular family of quantum error correcting codes, with the special property of being invariant under permutations of the qubits. Given integers g (the gap), n (the occupancy), and m (the length of the code), the two codewords are

$$|0_{\rm L}\rangle = \sum_{\ell\, \textrm{even}\atop 0\le\ell\le n} \sqrt{\frac{{n\choose \ell}}{2^{n-1}}} |D^m_{g\ell}\rangle$$
$$|1_{\rm L}\rangle = \sum_{\ell\, \textrm{odd}\atop 0\le\ell\le n} \sqrt{\frac{{n\choose \ell}}{2^{n-1}}} |D^m_{g\ell}\rangle$$

where $|D^m_k\rangle$ are the Dicke states consisting of a uniform superposition of all weight-k words on m qubits, e.g.

$$|D^4_2\rangle = \frac{|0011\rangle + |0101\rangle + |1001\rangle + |0110\rangle + |1010\rangle + |1100\rangle}{\sqrt{6}}$$

The real parameter $u = \frac{m}{gn}$ scales the length of the code. The number $u$ needs to be at least 1. The length $m = gnu$, hence the name of the code. The distance of the code is the minimum of $g$ and $n$. For $g = n$ and $u \ge 1$, the gnu code is capable of correcting $g-1$ erasure errors, or deletion errors. The code can also correct up to $\lfloor(g-1)/2\rfloor$ corrupted qubits from the property of the distance.
