= Soliton distribution =

Probability distribution for erasure codes

A soliton distribution is a type of discrete probability distribution that arises in the theory of erasure correcting codes, which use information redundancy to compensate for transmission errors manifesting as missing (erased) data. A paper by Luby introduced two forms of such distributions, the ideal soliton distribution and the robust soliton distribution.

== Ideal distribution ==
The ideal soliton distribution is a probability distribution on the integers from 1 to K, where K is the single parameter of the distribution. The probability mass function is given by

$$p(1)= \frac{1}{K},$$
$$p(i)= \frac{1}{i(i-1)} \qquad (i=2,3,\dots,K). \,$$

== Robust distribution ==
The robust form of distribution is defined by adding an extra set of values t(i) to the elements of mass function of the ideal soliton distribution and then normalizing so that the values add up to 1. The extra set of values, t(i), are defined in terms of an additional real-valued parameter δ (which is interpreted as a failure probability) and c, a constant parameter. Define R as R=c ln(K/δ)√K. Then the values added to p(i), before the final normalization, are

$$t(i)= \frac{R}{iK}, \qquad  \qquad  (i=1,2,\dots,K/R-1), \,$$
$$t(i)= \frac{R\ln(R/\delta)}{K}, \qquad (i=K/R), \,$$
$$t(i)= 0, \qquad  \qquad (i=K/R+1,\dots,K). \,$$

While the ideal soliton distribution has a mode (or spike) at 2, the effect of the extra component in the robust distribution is to add an additional spike at the value K/R.

== See also ==
- Luby transform code
