= Packet erasure channel =

Common noisy digital networking model

The packet erasure channel is a communication channel model where sequential packets are either received or lost (at a known location). This channel model is closely related to the binary erasure channel.

An erasure code can be used for forward error correction on such a channel.

== See also ==
- Network traffic simulation
- Packet loss
- Traffic generation model
