= Deletion channel =

Communications channel where bits may be dropped without notice

A deletion channel is a communications channel model used in coding theory and information theory. In this model, a transmitter sends a bit (a zero or a one), and the receiver either receives the bit (with probability $p$) or does not receive anything without being notified that the bit was dropped (with probability $1-p$). Determining the capacity of the deletion channel is an open problem.

The deletion channel should not be confused with the binary erasure channel which is much simpler to analyze.

== Formal description ==
Let $p$ be the deletion probability, $0 < p < 1$. The iid binary deletion channel is defined as follows:

Given an input sequence of $n$ bits $(X_i)$ as input, each bit in $X_n$ can be deleted with probability $p$. The deletion positions are unknown to the sender and the receiver. The output sequence $(Y_i)$ is the sequence of the $(X_i)$ which were not deleted, in the correct order and with no errors.

== Capacity ==
Unsolved problem in computer science:
What is the capacity of a deletion channel?
(more unsolved problems in computer science)

The capacity of the binary deletion channel (as an analytical expression of the deletion rate $p$) is unknown. It has a mathematical expression. Several upper and lower bounds are known.
