= Communication channel =

Physical or logical connection used for transmission of information

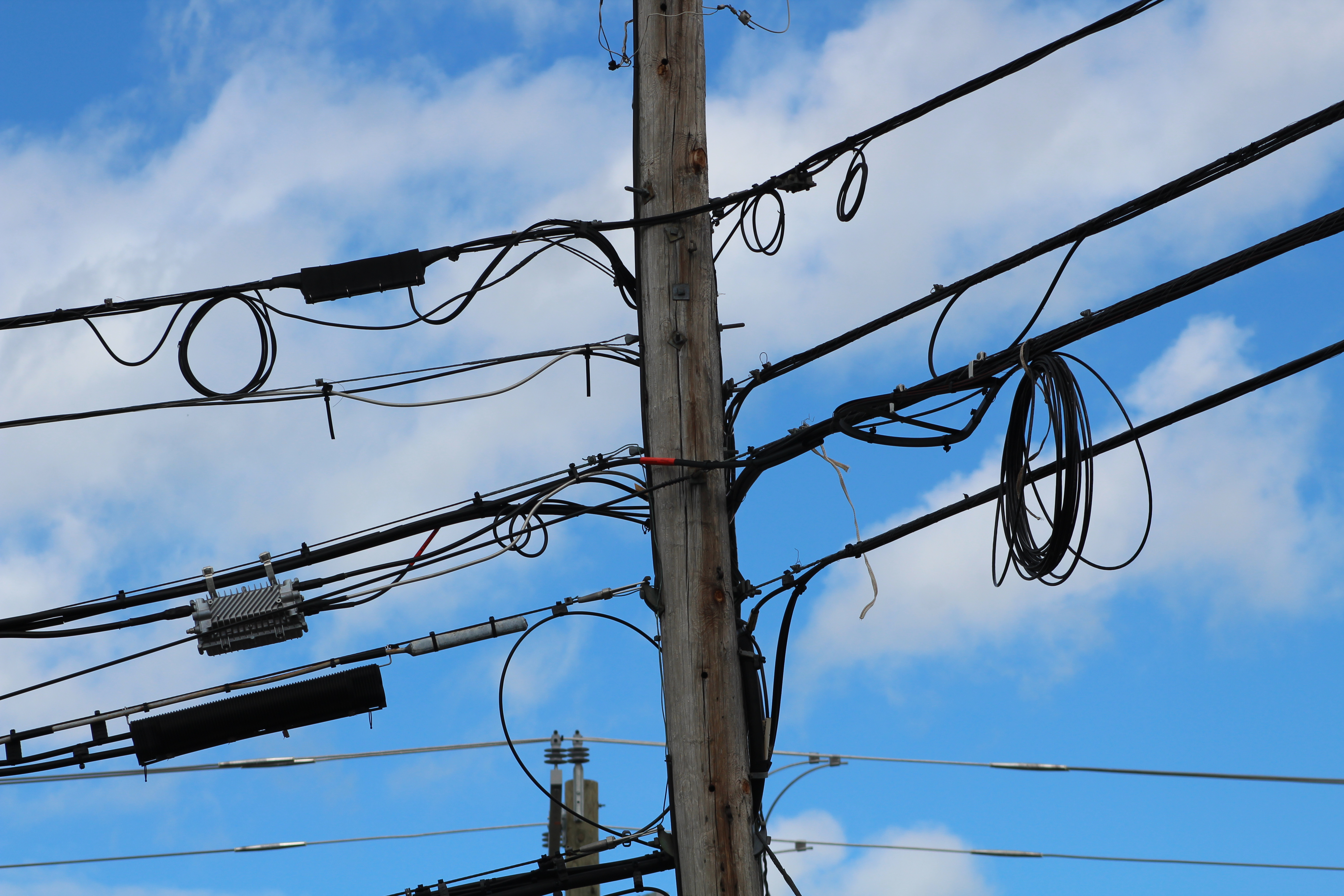
Different types of physical transmission media supporting communication channels

A communication channel refers either to a physical transmission medium such as a wire, or to a logical connection over a multiplexed medium such as a radio channel in telecommunications and computer networking. A channel is used for information transfer of, for example, a digital bit stream, from one or several senders to one or several receivers. A channel has a certain capacity for transmitting information, often measured by its bandwidth in Hz or its data rate in bits per second.

Communicating an information signal across distance requires some form of pathway or medium. These pathways, called communication channels, use two types of media: Transmission line-based telecommunications cable (e.g. twisted-pair, coaxial, and fiber-optic cable) and broadcast (e.g. microwave, satellite, radio, and infrared).

In information theory, a channel refers to a theoretical channel model with certain error characteristics. In this more general view, a storage device is also a communication channel, which can be sent to (written) and received from (reading) and allows communication of an information signal across time.

== Examples ==
Examples of communications channels include:

1. A connection between initiating and terminating communication endpoints of a telecommunication circuit.
2. A single path provided by a transmission medium via either
  - physical separation, such as by multipair cable or
  - separation, such as by frequency-division or time-division multiplexing.
3. A path for conveying electrical or electromagnetic signals, usually distinguished from other parallel paths.
  - A data storage device which can communicate a message over time.
  - The portion of a storage medium, such as a track or band, that is accessible to a given reading or writing station or head.
  - A buffer from which messages can be put and got.
4. In a communications system, the physical or logical link that connects a data source to a data sink.
5. A specific radio frequency, pair or band of frequencies, usually named with a letter, number, or codeword, and often allocated by international agreement, for example:
  - Marine VHF radio uses some 88 channels in the VHF band for two-way FM voice communication. Channel 16, for example, is 156.800 MHz. In the US, seven additional channels, WX1 - WX7, are allocated for weather broadcasts.
  - Television channels such as North American TV Channel 2 at 55.25 MHz, Channel 13 at 211.25 MHz. Each channel is 6 MHz wide. This was based on the bandwidth required by analog television signals. Since 2006, television broadcasting has switched to digital modulation (digital television) which uses image compression to transmit a television signal in a much smaller bandwidth, so each of these physical channels has been divided into multiple virtual channels each carrying a DTV channel.
  - Original Wi-Fi uses 13 channels in the ISM bands from 2412 MHz to 2484 MHz in 5 MHz steps.
  - The radio channel between an amateur radio repeater and an amateur radio operator uses two frequencies often 600 kHz (0.6 MHz) apart. For example, a repeater that transmits on 146.94 MHz typically listens for a ham transmitting on 146.34 MHz.

All of these communication channels share the property that they transfer information. The information is carried through the channel by a signal.

== Channel models ==
Mathematical models of the channel can be made to describe how the input (the transmitted signal) is mapped to the output (the received signal). There exist many types and uses of channel models specific to the field of communication. In particular, separate models are formulated to describe each layer of a communication system.

A channel can be modeled physically by trying to calculate the physical processes which modify the transmitted signal. For example, in wireless communications, the channel can be modeled by calculating the reflection from every object in the environment. A sequence of random numbers might also be added to simulate external interference or electronic noise in the receiver.

Statistically, a communication channel is usually modeled as a tuple consisting of an input alphabet, an output alphabet, and for each pair (i, o) of input and output elements, a transition probability p(i, o). Semantically, the transition probability is the probability that the symbol o is received given that i was transmitted over the channel.

Statistical and physical modeling can be combined. For example, in wireless communications, the channel is often modeled by a random attenuation (known as fading) of the transmitted signal, followed by additive noise. The attenuation term is a simplification of the underlying physical processes and captures the change in signal power over the course of the transmission. The noise in the model captures external interference or electronic noise in the receiver. If the attenuation term is complex it also describes the relative time a signal takes to get through the channel. The statistical properties of the attenuation in the model are determined by previous measurements or physical simulations.

Communication channels are also studied in discrete-alphabet modulation schemes. The mathematical model consists of a transition probability that specifies an output distribution for each possible sequence of channel inputs. In information theory, it is common to start with memoryless channels in which the output probability distribution only depends on the current channel input.

A channel model may either be digital or analog.

=== Digital channel models ===
In a digital channel model, the transmitted message is modeled as a digital signal at a certain protocol layer. Underlying protocol layers are replaced by a simplified model. The model may reflect channel performance measures such as bit rate, bit errors, delay, delay variation, etc. Examples of digital channel models include:

- Binary symmetric channel (BSC), a discrete memoryless channel with a certain bit error probability
- Binary asymmetric channel (BAC), similar to BSC, but the probability of a flip from 0 to 1 and vice versa is unequal
- Binary bursty bit error channel model, a channel with memory
- Binary erasure channel (BEC), a discrete channel with a certain bit error detection (erasure) probability
- Packet erasure channel, where packets are lost with a certain packet loss probability or packet error rate
- Arbitrarily varying channel (AVC), where the behavior and state of the channel can change randomly

=== Analog channel models ===
In an analog channel model, the transmitted message is modeled as an analog signal. The model can be a linear or non-linear, time-continuous or time-discrete (sampled), memoryless or dynamic (resulting in burst errors), time-invariant or time-variant (also resulting in burst errors), baseband, passband (RF signal model), real-valued or complex-valued signal model. The model may reflect the following channel impairments:

- Noise model, for example
  - Additive white Gaussian noise (AWGN) channel, a linear continuous memoryless model
  - Phase noise model
- Interference model, for example crosstalk (co-channel interference) and intersymbol interference (ISI)
- Distortion model, for example a non-linear channel model causing intermodulation distortion (IMD)
- Frequency response model, including attenuation and phase-shift
- Group delay model
- Modelling of underlying physical layer transmission techniques, for example a complex-valued equivalent baseband model of modulation and frequency response
- Radio frequency propagation model, for example
  - Log-distance path loss model
  - Fading model, for example Rayleigh fading, Ricean fading, log-normal shadow fading and frequency selective (dispersive) fading
  - Doppler shift model, which combined with fading results in a time-variant system
  - Ray tracing models, which attempt to model the signal propagation and distortions for specified transmitter-receiver geometries, terrain types, and antennas
  - Propagation graph, models signal dispersion by representing the radio propagation environment by a graph.
  - Mobility models, which also causes a time-variant system

== Types ==
- Digital (discrete) or analog (continuous) channel
- Transmission medium, for example a fiber-optic cable
- Multiplexed channel
- Computer network virtual channel
- Simplex communication, duplex communication or half-duplex communication channel
- Return channel
- Uplink or downlink (upstream or downstream channel)
- Broadcast channel, unicast channel or multicast channel

== Channel performance measures ==
These are examples of commonly used channel capacity and performance measures:

- Spectral bandwidth in Hertz
- Symbol rate in baud, symbols/s
- Digital bandwidth in bit/s measures: gross bit rate (signalling rate), net bit rate (information rate), channel capacity, and maximum throughput
- Channel utilization
- Spectral efficiency
- Signal-to-noise ratio in decibel measures: signal-to-interference ratio, E_{b}/N_{0}
- Bit error rate (BER), packet error rate (PER)
- Latency in seconds: propagation time, transmission time, round-trip delay, end-to-end delay
- Packet delay variation
- Eye pattern

== Multi-terminal channels, with application to cellular systems ==
In networks, as opposed to point-to-point communication, the communication media can be shared between multiple communication endpoints (terminals). Depending on the type of communication, different terminals can cooperate or interfere with each other. In general, any complex multi-terminal network can be considered as a combination of simplified multi-terminal channels. The following channels are the principal multi-terminal channels first introduced in the field of information theory:

- A point-to-multipoint channel, also known as a broadcast medium (not to be confused with broadcasting channel): In this channel, a single sender transmits multiple messages to different destination nodes. All wireless channels except directional links can be considered as broadcasting media, but may not always provide broadcast service. The downlink of a cellular system can be considered as a point-to-multipoint channel, if only one cell is considered and inter-cell co-channel interference is neglected. However, the communication service of a phone call is unicasting.
- Multiple access channel: In this channel, multiple senders transmit multiple possible different messages over a shared physical medium to one or several destination nodes. This requires a channel access scheme, including a media access control (MAC) protocol combined with a multiplexing scheme. This channel model has applications in the uplink of cellular networks.
- Relay channel: In this channel, one or several intermediate nodes (called relay, repeater or gap filler nodes) cooperate with a sender to send the message to an ultimate destination node.
- Interference channel: In this channel, two different senders transmit their data to different destination nodes. Hence, the different senders can have a possible crosstalk or co-channel interference on the signal of each other. The inter-cell interference in cellular wireless communications is an example of an interference channel. In spread-spectrum systems like 3G, interference also occurs inside the cell if non-orthogonal codes are used.
- A unicast channel is a channel that provides a unicast service, i.e. that sends data addressed to one specific user. An established phone call is an example.
- A broadcast channel is a channel that provides a broadcasting service, i.e. that sends data addressed to all users in the network. Cellular network examples are the paging service as well as the Multimedia Broadcast Multicast Service.
- A multicast channel is a channel where data is addressed to a group of subscribing users. LTE examples are the physical multicast channel (PMCH) and multicast broadcast single frequency network (MBSFN).
