= Interference channel =

In information theory, the interference channel is the basic model used to analyze the effect of interference in communication channels. The model consists of two pairs of users communicating through a shared channel. The problem of interference between two mobile users in close proximity or crosstalk between two parallel landlines are two examples where this model is applicable.

Unlike in the point-to-point channel, where the amount of information that can be sent through the channel is limited by the noise that distorts the transmitted signal, in the interference channel the presence of the signal from the other user may also impair the communication. However, since the transmitted signals are not purely random (otherwise they would not be decodable), the receivers may be able to reduce the effect of the interference by partially or totally decoding the undesired signal.

== Discrete memoryless interference channel ==
The mathematical model for this channel is the following:

Interference channel model

where, for $i\in\{1,2\}$:

- $W_i$ is the message to be transmitted by user $i$;
- $X_i$ is the channel input symbol ($X_i^n$ is a sequence of $n$ symbols) of user $i$;
- $Y_i$ is the channel output symbol ($Y_i^n$ is a sequence of $n$ symbols) of user $i$;
- $\hat{W}_i$ is the estimate of the transmitted message by user $i$; and
- $p(y_1,y_2|x_1,x_2)$ is the noisy memoryless channel, which is modeled by a conditional probability distribution.

The capacity of this channel model is not known in general; only for special cases of $p(y_1,y_2|x_1,x_2)$ the capacity has been calculated, e.g., in the case of strong interference or deterministic channels.

A widely used inner bound is the Han–Kobayashi achievable region, introduced by Te Sun Han and Kingo Kobayashi in 1981. In this scheme, each sender splits its message into a private part and a common part, so that receivers can decode part of the interfering transmission while treating the remaining interference as noise. For the Gaussian interference channel, a later refinement of the Han–Kobayashi approach was shown to achieve the capacity region to within one bit.
