= Binary erasure channel =

Model of noisy digital information transfer and storage

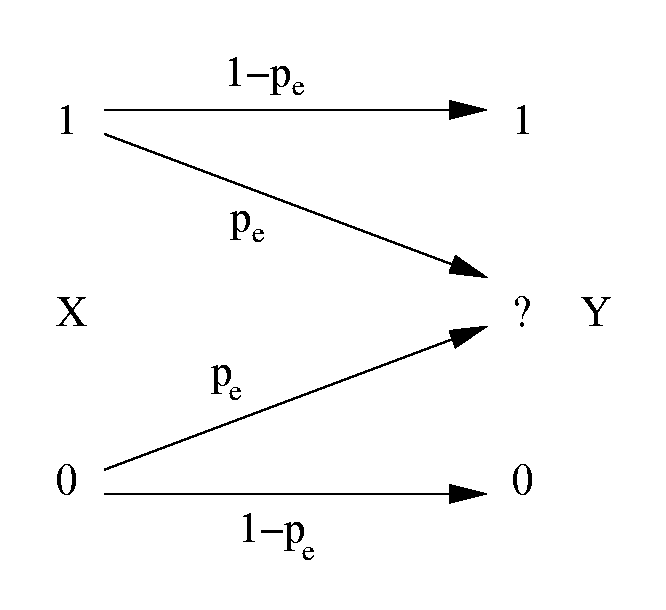
The channel model for the binary erasure channel showing a mapping from channel input X to channel output Y (with known erasure symbol ?). The probability of erasure is $p_e$

In coding theory and information theory, a binary erasure channel (BEC) is a communications channel model. A transmitter sends a bit (a zero or a one), and the receiver either receives the bit correctly, or with some probability $P_e$ receives a message that the bit was not received ("erased") .

== Definition ==
A binary erasure channel with erasure probability $P_e$ is a channel with binary input, ternary output, and probability of erasure $P_e$. That is, let $X$ be the transmitted random variable with alphabet $\{0,1\}$. Let $Y$ be the received variable with alphabet $\{0,1,\text{e} \}$, where $\text{e}$ is the erasure symbol. Then, the channel is characterized by the conditional probabilities:

$$\begin{align}
\operatorname {Pr} [ Y = 0 | X = 0 ] &= 1 - P_e \\
\operatorname {Pr} [ Y = 0 | X = 1 ] &= 0 \\
\operatorname {Pr} [ Y = 1 | X = 0 ] &= 0 \\
\operatorname {Pr} [ Y = 1 | X = 1 ] &= 1 - P_e \\
\operatorname {Pr} [ Y = e | X = 0 ] &= P_e \\
\operatorname {Pr} [ Y = e | X = 1 ] &= P_e
\end{align}$$

== Capacity ==
The channel capacity of a BEC is $1-P_e$, attained with a uniform distribution for $X$ (i.e. half of the inputs should be 0 and half should be 1).

Proof
By symmetry of the input values, the optimal input distribution is $X \sim \mathrm{Bernoulli}\left(\frac{1}{2}\right)$. The channel capacity is:

$$\operatorname{I}(X;Y) = \operatorname{H}(X)-\operatorname{H}(X|Y)$$

Observe that, for the binary entropy function $\operatorname{H}_\text{b}$ (which has value 1 for input $\frac{1}{2}$),

$$\operatorname{H}(X|Y)=\sum_y P(y)\operatorname{H}(X|y)=P_e \operatorname{H}_{\text{b}}\left(\frac{1}{2}\right) = P_e$$

as $X$ is known from (and equal to) y unless $y=e$, which has probability $P_e$.

By definition $\operatorname{H}(X)=\operatorname{H}_{\text{b}}\left(\frac{1}{2}\right)=1$, so

$$\operatorname{I}(X;Y) = 1-P_e$$.

If the sender is notified when a bit is erased, they can repeatedly transmit each bit until it is correctly received, attaining the capacity $1-P_e$. However, by the noisy-channel coding theorem, the capacity of $1-P_e$ can be obtained even without such feedback.

== Related channels ==
If bits are flipped rather than erased, the channel is a binary symmetric channel (BSC), which has capacity $1 - \operatorname H_\text{b}(P_e)$ (for the binary entropy function $\operatorname{H}_\text{b}$), which is less than the capacity of the BEC for $0<P_e<1/2$. If bits are erased but the receiver is not notified (i.e. does not receive the output $e$) then the channel is a deletion channel, and its capacity is an open problem.

== History ==
The BEC was introduced by Peter Elias of MIT in 1955 as a toy example.

== See also ==
- Erasure code
- Packet erasure channel
