= EOB =

EOB may refer to:

- Ed O'Brien (b. 1968), member of the rock band Radiohead who releases solo music as EOB
- Eastern / Greek Orthodox Bible, an English-language Bible edition
- End of business
- Explanation of benefits
- Enemy Order of battle
- Electronic order of battle, a concept in intelligence management
- End of Block character, a character to terminate a transmission block
