= Block size =

Block size can refer to:

- Block (data storage), the size of a block in data storage and file systems.
- Block size (cryptography), the minimal unit of data for block ciphers.
- Block (telecommunications)
- Block size (mathematics)
- The size of a city block
