= Mobile Broadband Alliance =

The Mobile Broadband Alliance is a consortium of companies that have aligned to promote hardware with built-in HSPA broadband.

The companies include the mobile operators Vodafone, Orange, Telefónica Europe, T-Mobile, 3Group, Telecom Italia and TeliaSonera, and the hardware manufacturers Dell, Asus, Toshiba, Lenovo, Qualcomm, Ericsson, Gemalto, and ECS.
