= ARQ-M =

Radio telegraph protocol

ARQ-M, short for Automatic Repeat reQuest, Multiplex, is a radio telegraphy protocol used to reliably forward telex messages over partially reliable radio links. It is a low-speed system designed to match the performance of landline telex systems and allow those messages to be forwarded over long distances using shortwave radios. The first ARQ-M link was built in the Netherlands, and began exchanging messages with a counterpart in New York in 1947.

ARQ-M is similar in concept to ARQ-E, but ARQ-E has no multiplex capability and uses a different 7-bit alphabet.

== History ==
The telex system, which developed out of the telegraph system, is based on defined electric current levels that are interpreted as a mark or space signal. These are normally sent over well-defined networks with considerable infrastructure that keeps error rates very low. In contrast, radio communications are subject to a wide variety of noises and other signal problems that leads to losses. To forward telex messages successfully over radio links, some form of error correction should be applied.

ARQ-M was developed to automatically deal with errors. The automatic repeat request system was invented by Hendrik van Duuren of the Netherlands in the 1940s and so it became known as the Van Duuren automatic error correction system. The seven unit code used was called the Van Duuren code.

ARQ was first used commercially in 1947 with a link from Amsterdam to New York with the master station in Amsterdam. In May 1950 the TEX (Overseas teleprinter exchange) service between New York and Amsterdam started. TEX was an early name for TELEX which is a system to allow automatic routing of private messages from a sender to a receiver on the TELEX network. Prior to the introduction or ARQ-M there were so many errors in the messages received that staff from the telecommunications companies had to manually check messages and confirm correct receipt. Once ARQ-M was introduced, messages could be automatically and reliably sent over long distances via shortwave radio, and so was introduced into automatic systems. By 1956 ARQ radio circuits were running from New York to Amsterdam, Berne, Brussels, Frankfurt, London, Paramaribo, Paris, Rome, and Wien, with plans for Copenhagen, Lisbon, Madrid, and Oslo. Amsterdam had radio links to Berne, Curaçao, Jakarta, Paramaribo and Rome. Brussels linked to Leopoldville. Frankfurt was connected to Madrid and Rome with plans for Buenos Aires. A link from Madrid to Canary Islands was planned. By 1959 most radio circuits for Telex were using ARQ. International shortwave ARQ data links have been replaced by undersea cables and satellite circuits.

The New Zealand Post Office used a two channel multiplex ARQ system to communicate on two circuits between Wellington and Vancouver and Sydney over shortwave radio for a few years till 1961. The radio link was available for 22 or 23 hours a day, and could improve the error rate from 1% to 0.001%. In 1961 the radio system became a backup for the primary Commonwealth Pacific Cable System (COMPAC) undersea cable, with telegraph operations conducted using voice frequency telegraphy over telephone channels instead.

The Department of Transport in Australia used to run several multiplexed ARQ data links to remote airports prior to the use of AUSSAT. These were calls the aeronautical fixed teletype network. It was used to communicate aeronautical and meteorological data. A station at Perth, VZPH and VKP communicated with Cocos Island VZCC, Port Hedland VZPD, Darwin VZPM, and Sydney VZSY. The stations in Sydney (Pernrith Rx, Llandilo Tx) communicated with Alice Springs, VZAS, Mount Isa, VZMA, Norfolk Island VZNF, and Lord Howe Island, VZLH. International radioteletype links connected Sydney (as VLS3) to Singapore on 9ME and Jakarta 8BB.

Radio Corporation of America, who were the first in USA to use ARQ-M, named their ARQ equipment "automatic error reduction and correction equipment".

By 1990 use of ARQ-M had reduced. However it was still used by French Forces to communicate between Paris, and N'Djamena, Djibouti, Port de France, Papeete, Dakar, Port-Bouët, Le Port, Reunion. One link ran between Companhia Portuguesa Radio Marconi in Lisbon and the Vatican. The British Royal Army, Navy and Air force still used it from England and Gibraltar. Moscow had a link with Kabul, Havana and Hanoi. ASECNA had a network of west African airports. Moroni in the Comoros has a link to Paris, Stockholm had a link to Ho Chi Minh City, and Brussels had a link to Kinshasa. Canadian armed forces used shortwave radio as satellite links into the Arctic are difficult. Martin-de-Viviès, and Port-aux-Français connected back to France for Direction des Telecommunications des Reseaux Exterieurs.

On 17 November 2005 the European patent office rejected an appeal about overturned patent number 0309763 from NEC which attempted to patent a multiplexing system, after they agreed that it did not add anything new beyond European patent 0099101 A and the Siemens Elmux 1000.

== Description ==
ARQ-M is a duplex radio communications protocol used to ensure that data is transmitted correctly over a partially unreliable radio path.

Data is encoded using 7 unit binary codes sent using a seven bit error detecting code called Van Duuren code or CCITT Telegraph Alphabet No. 3. The data is sent in two channels labelled A and B, or four channels labeled A, B, C and D. Data from the different channels are interleaved using a time division multiplex system. The two channel system is called ARQ-M2, the four channel system is called ARQ-M4.

In order to synchronise to the synchronous data stream the encoded characters can be sent erect or inverted. Inverted means that the 0 and 1 are swapped, whereas erect means that the character is sent without modification. There are two possible channel arrangements depending on the latency of the circuit. For normal latency the cycle consists of four characters, and if the channel has extra long latency it has eight characters. Channel A (or C) has one character inverted followed by either three or seven erect characters. Channel B (or D) has one character erect followed by either three or seven inverted characters.

=== Transmission rates ===
There are several standard transmission rates. The preferred standard rates are 96 baud for the two channel system and 192 baud for the four channel system. These rates allowed running at the same speed as 50 baud Telex landline systems. The transmission cycle was 145 5/6 ms long. Another standard rate allowed interoperation with 45 baud networks, with a repetition cycle lasting 163 1/3 ms and baud rates of 85 5/7 and 171 3/7 for the two and four channel systems. The fastest standard speed used 100 and 200 baud, with a transmission cycle of 140 ms and was incompatible with land based networks, but more commonly used for point to point links.

=== Performance ===
Two performance measures give quality characteristics of an ARQ-M link. These are error rate and throughput. Residual errors can be due to transpositions of the symbol elements or double errors. The chances that this happens is about 100 to 1000 times less than for a working unprotected link. A log graph of residual error rate against raw error rate shows a steeper line with slope 2 intercepting at 100% errors. If the unprotected 5 unit code had an error rate of 1%, the ARQ-M protected code error rate is 0.0025%.

Throughput is reduced by errors. If the raw error rate increases to 3% the link will be blocked all the time with retransmissions. Each transmitted cycle of 28 bits has a likely chance of an error in these conditions. An eight character repeat cycle has twice the impact. At 1% raw errors the throughput for the 4 character cycle system is about 80%. On real equipment, an efficiency meter may indicate how good the throughput is.

=== Alphabet ===
The alphabet used in the ARQ-M protocol is based on the CCITT Telegraph Alphabet No. 2 more commonly known as Baudot. This alphabet has five bits, and therefore has 2^{5} or 32 different possible symbols. It uses letters shift and figures shifts to select different sets of characters similar to a typewriter. The ARQ-M alphabet being synchronous always has to send data and does not have gaps between characters. It does not include start and stop bits that would be used in asynchronous transmissions and so saves on those two bits per character. In asynchronous transmissions a steady stop signal indicates that there is nothing to send. A prolonged start signal can be used for signalling, for example to select a destination for a telex connection.

The ARQ-M characters are remapped to a seven bit system so that there are always three bits on and four bits off. The ARQ code is a Moore code, which can detect the modification of any single bit. This alphabet is CCITT Telegraph Alphabet No. 3 aka TOR No. 3. This differs from the alphabet used in the ARQ-E single channel system. Three additional control signals are added to the 32 from the Baudot set. Out of 128 seven bit characters there are 35 that have three one bits set, so allowing for the 32 Baudot and three control codes to just be accommodated. The extra control characters are RQ, meaning request repeat, α meaning constant space condition, which may indicate the end of a connection (break signal) or be used to signal information, such as a number to connect to, and the β character, meaning constant mark condition, used when there is nothing to send. The RQ signal is also called Signal Roman one and may be designated "I".

The number of one bits is checked by the receiver to tell if an error has occurred in the transmission of the character. There should be three ones in each character received. The return channel will include the RQ signal if an error is detected.

Letters shift	Figures shift	1	2	3	4	5	6	7
A	-	0	0	1	1	0	1	0
B	?	0	0	1	1	0	0	1
C	:	1	0	0	1	1	0	0
D	wru	0	0	1	1	1	0	0
E	3	0	1	1	1	0	0	0
F		0	0	1	0	0	1	1
G		1	1	0	0	0	0	1
H		1	0	1	0	0	1	0
I	8	1	1	1	0	0	0	0
J	bell	0	1	0	0	0	1	1
K	(	0	0	0	1	0	1	1
L	)	1	1	0	0	0	1	0
M	.	1	0	1	0	0	0	1
N	,	1	0	1	0	1	0	0
O	9	1	0	0	0	1	1	0
P	0	1	0	0	1	0	1	0
Q	1	0	0	0	1	1	0	1
R	4	1	1	0	0	1	0	0
S	'	0	1	0	1	0	1	0
T	5	1	0	0	0	1	0	1
U	7	0	1	1	0	0	1	0
V	=	1	0	0	1	0	0	1
W	2	0	1	0	0	1	0	1
X	/	0	0	1	0	1	1	0
Y	6	0	0	1	0	1	0	1
Z	+	0	1	1	0	0	0	1
cr	cr	1	0	0	0	0	1	1
lf	lf	1	0	1	1	0	0	0
ltrs		0	0	0	1	1	1	0
figs		0	1	0	0	1	1	0
space		1	1	0	1	0	0	0
		0	0	0	0	1	1	1
RQ		0	1	1	0	1	0	0
α		0	1	0	1	0	0	1
β		0	1	0	1	1	0	0

- ltrs is the symbol to activate the letters shift.
- figs is the symbol to activate figures shift.
- Space is equivalent to the space bar
- cr is carriage return
- lf is line feed
- Blank entries have undefined meaning in international communications, but may be defined within a country.

The code was invented by Hendrick van Duuren during World War II, and so has been called van Duuren code.

=== Marking ===
Seven bit characters have the alternative to be sent erect, meaning that 0 stays as 0 and 1 stays as 1, or inverted where each 0 changes to 1 and 1 changes to 0. The standard specifies a marking pattern which says which characters are erect and which are inverted in a particular pattern, that enables the system phase, channel and subchannel to be determined. Since the system is synchronous there is no start bit, and a receiver has to examine the bit stream to tell where the start of a marked cycle is. When system phase is established the correct received bit can be assigned to the correct place in each character in each channel. The receiver can determine that system phase is established as each character will contain three one bits and four zero bits. In recommendation 342-2 here are two different marking lengths schemes. For the four character repetition cycle, Channel A is encoded ↓↑↑↑ (4333) and channel B is marked ↑↓↓↓ (3444). These are combined in a time division multiplex method with characters in the order A1 B4 A2 B1 A3 B2 A4 B3 resulting in a marking pattern ↓↓↑↑↑↓↑↓ (44333434 one bits) to match the first character from channel A at the start.

For the eight character repetition cycle, Channel A is encoded ↓↑↑↑↑↑↑↑ (43333333) and channel B is marked ↑↓↓↓↓↓↓↓ (34444444). The combination marking pattern ↓↓↑↑↑↓↑↓↑↓↑↓↑↓↑↓ (4433343434343434 one bits). In practice the eight character repetition cycle has not been observed in use on the airwaves.

In a four channel system, channel C is encoded the same way as channel B, and channel D the same as for channel A. Bits for channel C are interleaved with channel A and those for D interleaved with channel B. Elements of A come before C, and B come before D.

In CCIR recommendation 242 the marking is much simpler with the A channel erect and the B channel inverted.

=== Subchannels ===
Each of the two or four channels has the option to be split into four subchannels so that more streams of data can be sent, but at lower rates. These subchannels are numbered 1 to 4. The subchannel numbered 1 is identified by being the character that has the different polarity from the others in the stream. So the subchannels will be arranged like this in the multiplex 4CRC stream where italic means inverted:

A1 B4 A2 B1 A3 B2 A4 B3

If a data stream that is half rate is required, then subchannels 1 and 3, or 2 and 4 are combined. A three quarter rate subchannel can be made by combining subchannels 2, 3 and 4. If one half-rate and two quarter rates are required the half-rate gets subchannels 2 and 4. The facility to split the channel is called a channel divider. It would provide a stop signal during the time when a sub-rate user is not receiving a character. Costs for such a circuit were lower than for a full rate. The marking system used enables the receiver to determine the subchannel order.

In practice use of subchannels has not been observed although international partial rate fixed services were once available.

=== System setup ===
In order to have a functioning system, a circuit has to be set up consisting of two transmissions in both directions. One station will be the master, and the other will be the slave station. The slave station will determine its timing from the master station.

The first stage is automatic phasing, also called phase hunting, where each end will determine the correct phase of the character stream. During this stage a receiver will slip a bit until system phase is achieved and the system phase matches the marking pattern. The slave station is supposed to send seven bits 0000000 or 1111111 in place of the signal repetition.

Once synchronisation is achieved data can be transferred. The mark signal will be sent to the connected equipment so signal that the circuit is available. As characters are received at one end they will be inverted according to the marking pattern and checked for the present of three 1 (mark) symbols. If it is an error, a RQ character is sent on the return path. No characters are sent on from the receiver for a period of four character times. If an RQ character is received, then the transmitter will start a BQ-cycle in response, send an RQ character and repeat the last three characters sent. This phase of operation is called cycling as the same four characters will be recycled. Hopefully the receiver will have good reception of these and then forward them. If not the RQ will re sent again and repetition attempted.

== Standards ==
ARQ-M is recommended by CCIR 342-2 (now called ITU-R F.342-2) and earlier CCIR 242.

ARQ-M was standardised by the Comité consultatif international pour la radio. The XII Plenary session in New Delhi in 1970 approved recommendation 342-2 Automatic error-correcting system for telegraph signals transmitted over radio circuits. The CCITT produced recommendation S.13 Use on radio circuits of 7-unit synchronous systems giving error correction by automatic repetition.

The earlier Recommendation 242 is not compatible with F.342-2. This had an equivalent CCIT document approved in 1956 at Geneva C.24.

Alternative names for ARQ-M are TDM, TDM-242, TDM-342 or 96-TDM. ARQ-M2 is also known as TDM-2, or ARQ-28, and the ARQ-M4 variant is known as TDM-4, or ARQ-56.

== Equipment ==
Companies that manufactured equipment for this system were found in Germany, Japan, Netherlands, Switzerland, and USA. The companies include RCA, the Marconi HU121, and the Electra Mux.

Hasler from Berne in Switzerland made a four channel TOR (Telex on Radio) system.

RCA called their equipment RCA Electronic Multiplex.

Siemens AG made an ARQ terminal in 1956 called Multiplex-Funkfernschreibanlage MUX 4D 7a, and later a two channel ARQ terminal called the Elmux 1000.

The equipment for the ARQ-M systems contained a receive side and a transmit side. Each channel also had supporting circuitry for channel A and B, and C and D if present. Each subchannel also had supporting circuitry controlled by a channel divider.

The channel divider has output control lines for each subchannel A1 A2 A3 A4 B1 ... for both receive and transmit sides. The signals from the divider outputs are combined with and-gates in the subchannel circuitry. Each subchannel on the send section side includes a serial to parallel converter, and a tripping pulse that clocks in the next character. On the receive section side and output buffer is driven by the and-gate that picks the channel receive character selected by the channel divider signal at the appropriate time.

On the send section the channel circuit includes a delay line feeding a repetition storage. The common send section circuit includes a code translator that changes the five bit code to the seven bit code. Next the seven bit character goes to an output shift register, and then to a polarity inverter. For a four channel system the bits would then be interleaved between AB and CD channels. The final send step is a tone modulator and output circuit. The tone is modulated using frequency-shift keying. The 0 (or space) signal picks out a lower frequency, and the 1 ( or mark signal) picks out a higher frequency. This signal to frequency conversion may be inverted, and this is common below 10 MHz.

On the receive section the signal from the radio receiver comes to a tone demodulator, then a polarity inverter, and then to an error checking circuit, and at the same time to an input shift register that converts from serial to parallel. Next it goes to a code translator to convert from seven bits to five bits. From here the five bit code goes to a parallel to serial converter, controlled by a repetition cycle timer on the receive side.

== Interoperation ==
Because the telex network does not give feedback to a sender about when a message is delivered, and a shortwave ARQ link may or may not be available, systems with ARQ links set them up to be store and forward half duplex systems. This means that a telex sender transmits their telegram in full to the message centre that then stores and forwards the message over the shortwave link when it is available. Call charges were calculated for the time when the link was running without errors, either at six or ten second increments. CCITT recommended not charging if reliability was below 80%, and to give a busy signal if reliability was not satisfactory.

Signalling is needed to determine the start and end of a call, and the destination of the connection. Two systems have been used, signalling system B CCITT U1 and CCITT U20. An international telex exchange would have signalling conversion facilities.

== Monitoring ==
For radio spectrum monitors, ARQ-M is classified as a digital mode, and radio stations that use it will be termed utility stations. Two stations communicating with ARQ-M will use two different frequencies as data is continuously transmitted in each direction. Channels are often running in idle mode and have a rhythmic sound, as the symbol pattern repeats every 7/12 second. A fax machine running at 240 lines per minute can record the overall pattern of symbols. Such a chart will show 24 pulses on each line for a two channel system, forming columns down the page. Timing is very accurate with each symbol lasting the same time of 10.416666 ms. This is the duration for 96 baud elements.

Software is available to receive and decode utility transmissions that use ARQ-M including Go2MONITOR, and there is also hardware such as the Code300-A from Hoka Electronic, and Wavecom M 4010.
