= High Speed Packet Access =

3G mobile telecommunications protocols

HSPA icon on an Android smartphone

High Speed Packet Access (HSPA) is an amalgamation of two mobile protocols—High Speed Downlink Packet Access (HSDPA) and High Speed Uplink Packet Access (HSUPA)—that extends and improves the performance of existing 3G mobile telecommunication networks using the WCDMA protocols. A further-improved 3GPP standard called Evolved High Speed Packet Access (also known as HSPA+) was released late in 2008, with subsequent worldwide adoption beginning in 2010. The newer standard allows bit rates to reach as high as 337 Mbit/s in the downlink and 34 Mbit/s in the uplink; however, these speeds are rarely achieved in practice.

== Overview ==
The first HSPA specifications supported increased peak data rates of up to 14 Mbit/s in the downlink and 5.76 Mbit/s in the uplink. They also reduced latency and provided up to five times more system capacity in the downlink and up to twice as much system capacity in the uplink compared with original WCDMA protocol.

== High Speed Downlink Packet Access (HSDPA) ==
Cellular network standards and generation timeline

High Speed Downlink Packet Access (HSDPA) is an enhanced 3G (third-generation) mobile communications protocol in the High-Speed Packet Access (HSPA) family. HSDPA is also known as 3.5G and 3G+. It allows networks based on the Universal Mobile Telecommunications System (UMTS) to have higher data speeds and capacity. HSDPA also decreases latency, and therefore the round-trip time for applications.

HSDPA was introduced in 3GPP Release 5. It was accompanied by an improvement to the uplink that provided a new bearer of 384 kbit/s (the previous maximum bearer was 128 kbit/s). Evolved High Speed Packet Access (HSPA+), introduced in 3GPP Release 7, further increased data rates by adding 64QAM modulation, MIMO, and Dual-Carrier HSDPA operation. Under 3GPP Release 11, even higher speeds of up to 337.5 Mbit/s were possible.

The first phase of HSDPA was specified in 3GPP Release 5. This phase introduced new basic functions and was aimed to achieve peak data rates of 14.0 Mbit/s with significantly reduced latency. The improvement in speed and latency reduced the cost per bit and enhanced support for high-performance packet data applications. HSDPA is based on shared channel transmission, and its key features are shared channel and multi-code transmission, higher-order modulation, short Transmission Time Interval (TTI), fast link adaptation and scheduling, and fast hybrid automatic repeat request (HARQ). Additional new features include the High Speed Downlink Shared Channels (HS-DSCH), quadrature phase-shift keying, 16-quadrature amplitude modulation, and the High Speed Medium Access protocol (MAC-hs) in base stations.

The upgrade to HSDPA is often just a software update for WCDMA networks. In HSDPA, voice calls are usually prioritized over data transfer.

=== User equipment categories ===
The following table is derived from table 5.1a of the release 11 of 3GPP TS 25.306 and shows maximum data rates of different device classes and by what combination of features they are achieved. The per-cell, per-stream data rate is limited by the "maximum number of bits of an HS-DSCH transport block received within an HS-DSCH TTI" and the "minimum inter-TTI interval". The TTI is 2 milliseconds. So, for example, Cat 10 can decode 27,952 bits / 2 ms = 13.976 Mbit/s (and not 14.4 Mbit/s as often claimed incorrectly). Categories 1-4 and 11 have inter-TTI intervals of 2 or 3, which reduces the maximum data rate by that factor. Dual-Cell and MIMO 2x2 each multiply the maximum data rate by 2, because multiple independent transport blocks are transmitted over different carriers or spatial streams, respectively. The data rates given in the table are rounded to one decimal point.

HSDPA User Equipment (UE) categories
| Category | Release | Max. number of HS-DSCH codes (per cell) | Modulation (Note: 16-QAM implies QPSK support, 64-QAM implies 16-QAM and QPSK support.) | MIMO, Multi-Cell | Code rate at max. data rate (Note: The maximal code rate is not limited. A value close to 1 in this column indicates that the maximum data rate can be achieved only in ideal conditions. The device is therefore connected directly to the transmitter to demonstrate these data rates.) | Max. downlink speed (Mbit/s) (Note: The maximum data rates given in the table are physical layer data rates. Application layer data rate is approximately 85% of that, due to the inclusion of IP headers (overhead information) etc.) |
|---|---|---|---|---|---|---|
| 1 | 5 | 5 | 16-QAM | | .76 | 1.2 |
| 2 | 5 | 5 | 16-QAM | | .76 | 1.2 |
| 3 | 5 | 5 | 16-QAM | | .76 | 1.8 |
| 4 | 5 | 5 | 16-QAM | | .76 | 1.8 |
| 5 | 5 | 5 | 16-QAM | | .76 | 3.6 |
| 6 | 5 | 5 | 16-QAM | | .76 | 3.6 |
| 7 | 5 | 10 | 16-QAM | | .75 | 7.2 |
| 8 | 5 | 10 | 16-QAM | | .76 | 7.2 |
| 9 | 5 | 15 | 16-QAM | | .70 | 10.1 |
| 10 | 5 | 15 | 16-QAM | | .97 | 14.0 |
| 11 | 5 | 5 | QPSK | | .76 | 0.9 |
| 12 | 5 | 5 | QPSK | | .76 | 1.8 |

Further UE categories were defined from 3GGP Release 7 onwards as Evolved HSPA (HSPA+) and are listed in Evolved HSDPA UE Categories.

=== Adoption ===
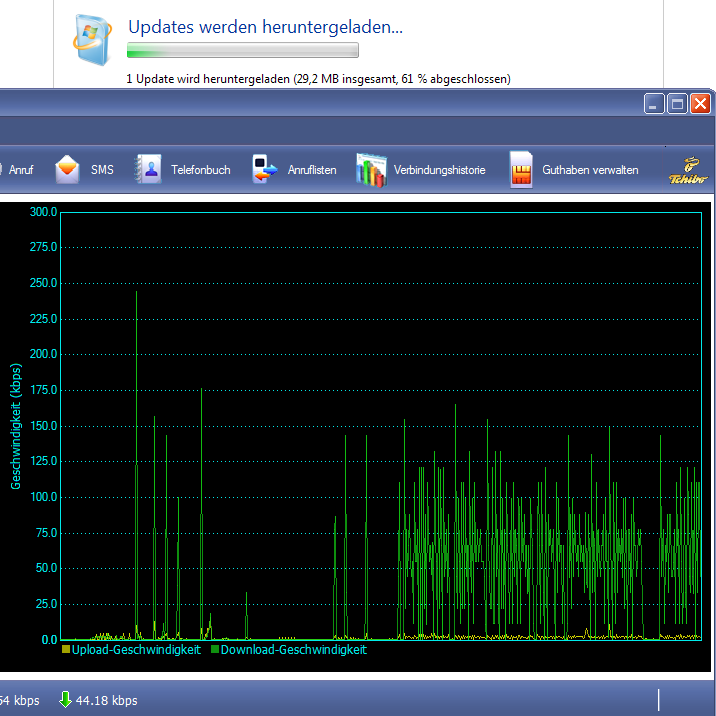
GPRS-speed in a HSDPA plan

As of 28 August 2009, 250 HSDPA networks had commercially launched mobile broadband services in 109 countries. 169 HSDPA networks supported 3.6 Mbit/s peak downlink data throughput, and a growing number delivered 21 Mbit/s peak data downlink.

CDMA2000-EVDO networks had the early lead on performance. In particular, Japanese providers were highly successful benchmarks for this network standard. However, this later changed in favor of HSDPA, as an increasing number of providers worldwide began adopting it.

In 2007, an increasing number of telcos worldwide began selling HSDPA USB modems to provide mobile broadband connections. In addition, the popularity of HSDPA landline replacement boxes grew—these provided HSDPA for data via Ethernet and Wi-Fi, as well as ports for connecting traditional landline telephones. Some were marketed with connection speeds of "up to 7.2 Mbit/s" under ideal conditions. However, these services could be slower, such as when in fringe coverage indoors.

== High Speed Uplink Packet Access (HSUPA) ==
High-Speed Uplink Packet Access (HSUPA) is a 3G mobile telephony protocol in the HSPA family. It is specified and standardized in 3GPP Release 6 to improve the uplink data rate to 5.76 Mbit/s, extend capacity, and reduce latency. Together with additional improvements, this allows for new features such as Voice over Internet Protocol (VoIP), uploading pictures, and sending large e-mail messages.

HSUPA was the second major step in the UMTS evolution process. It has since been superseded by newer technologies with higher transfer rates, such as LTE (150 Mbit/s for downlink and 50 Mbit/s for uplink) and LTE Advanced (maximum downlink rates of over 1 Gbit/s).

=== Technology ===
HSUPA adds a new transport channel to WCDMA, called the Enhanced Dedicated Channel (E-DCH). It also features several improvements similar to those of HSDPA, including multi-code transmission, shorter transmission time interval enabling faster link adaptation, fast scheduling, and fast hybrid automatic repeat request (HARQ) with incremental redundancy, making retransmissions more effective. Similar to HSDPA, HSUPA uses a "packet scheduler", but it operates on a "request-grant" principle where the user equipment (UE) requests permission to send data and the scheduler decides when and how many UEs will be allowed to do so. A request for transmission contains data about the state of the transmission buffer and the queue at the UE and its available power margin. However, unlike HSDPA, uplink transmissions are not orthogonal to each other.

In addition to this "scheduled" mode of transmission, the standards allow a self-initiated transmission mode from the UEs, denoted "non-scheduled". The non-scheduled mode can, for example, be used for VoIP services for which even the reduced TTI and the Node B based scheduler are unable to provide the necessary short delay time and constant bandwidth.

Each MAC-d flow (i.e., QoS flow) is configured to use either scheduled or non-scheduled modes. The UE adjusts the data rate for scheduled and non-scheduled flows independently. The maximum data rate of each non-scheduled flow is configured at call setup, and typically not frequently changed. The power used by the scheduled flows is controlled dynamically by the Node B through absolute grant (consisting of an actual value) and relative grant (consisting of a single up/down bit) messages.

At the physical layer, HSUPA introduces the following new channels:

- E-AGCH (Absolute Grant Channel)
- E-RGCH (Relative Grant Channel)
- F-DPCH (Fractional-DPCH)
- E-HICH (E-DCH Hybrid ARQ Indicator Channel)
- E-DPCCH (E-DCH Dedicated Physical Control Channel) – carries the control information associated with the E-DCH Transport Channel
- E-DPDCH (E-DCH Dedicated Physical Data Channel) – carries the E-DCH Transport Channel

=== User equipment categories ===
The following table shows uplink speeds for the different categories of HSUPA:

HSUPA User Equipment (UE) categories
| HSUPA Category | Release | Max. Uplink Speed (Mbit/s) | Modulation |
|---|---|---|---|
| 1 | 6 | 0.73 | QPSK |
| 2 | 6 | 1.46 | QPSK |
| 3 | 6 | 1.46 | QPSK |
| 4 | 6 | 2.93 | QPSK |
| 5 | 6 | 2.00 | QPSK |
| 6 | 6 | 5.76 | QPSK |

Further UE categories were defined from 3GGP Release 7 onwards as Evolved HSPA (HSPA+) and are listed in Evolved HSUPA UE Categories.

== Evolved High Speed Packet Access (HSPA+) ==
Evolved HSPA (also known as HSPA Evolution, HSPA+) is a wireless broadband standard defined in 3GPP release 7 of the WCDMA specification. It provides extensions to the existing HSPA definitions and is therefore backward compatible all the way to the original Release 99 WCDMA network releases. Evolved HSPA provides data rates between 42.2 and 56 Mbit/s in the downlink and 22 Mbit/s in the uplink (per 5 MHz carrier) with multiple input, multiple output (2x2 MIMO) technologies and higher order modulation (64 QAM). With Dual Cell technology, these can be doubled.

Since 2011, HSPA+ has been widely deployed among WCDMA operators, with nearly 200 commitments.

== See also ==
- Broadband
- Cellular router
- DigRF V3
- Global mobile Suppliers Association
- Internet access
- List of device bandwidths
- List of UMTS networks
- Mobile Broadband Alliance
- Multi-band device (dual-band, tri-band, quad-band, penta-band)
- UMTS frequency bands

== Bibliography ==
- Sauter, Martin (2006). Communication Systems for the Mobile Information Society. Chichester: John Wiley. ISBN 0-470-02676-6.
- Harri Holma and Antti Toskala (2006). HSDPA/HSUPA for UMTS: High Speed Radio Access for Mobile Communications. Wiley. ISBN 0-470-01884-4.
- Stuhlfauth, Reiner (2012). High Speed Packet Access: Technology and measurement aspects of HSDPA and HSUPA mobile radio systems. Munich. ISBN 978-3-939837-14-5.
