= Transverse redundancy check =

Telecommunications redundancy check

In telecommunications, a transverse redundancy check (TRC) or vertical redundancy check is a redundancy check for synchronized parallel bits applied once per bit time, across the bit streams. This requires additional parallel channels for the check bit or bits.

The term usually applies to a single parity bit, although it could also be used to refer to a larger Hamming code.

The adjective "transverse" is most often used when it is used in combination with additional error control coding, such as a longitudinal redundancy check. Although parity alone can only detect and not correct errors, it can be part of a system for correcting errors.

An example of a TRC is the parity written to the 9th track of a 9-track tape.
