= Reliable Data Protocol =

The Reliable Data Protocol (RDP) is a network transport protocol defined in RFC 908 and was updated in RFC 1151. It is meant to provide facilities for remote loading, debugging and bulk transfer of images and data.

The Reliable Data Protocol is an IP protocol, on the same layer as TCP and UDP. Its IP protocol number is 27

Similar to TCP, the Reliable Data Protocol is connection-oriented, meaning that a connection needs to be established between the client and the server before data transmission can occur. However, unlike TCP, it can provide sequenced delivery of segments as an option.

The Reliable Data Protocol has seen limited adoption, though experimental implementations for BSD exist.

== See also ==
- Reliable Data Transfer
