= ARQ-E =

ARQ-E is a radio transmission method used to send data over short wave radio. ARQ-E is a full duplex synchronous data communications system that requests repeats if data is not received correctly. It uses an alphabet that can detect errors. Another name for this is ARQ-1000 duplex or ARQ-1000D.

== Alphabet ==
The alphabet used in the ARQ-E protocol is an extension of the CCITT Telegraph Alphabet No. 2 more commonly known as Baudot. This alphabet has five bits, and therefore has 2^{5} or 32 different possible symbols. The ARQ-M alphabet being synchronous always has to send data and does not have gaps between characters. It does not include start and stop bits that would be used in asynchronous transmissions. In asynchronous transmissions a steady stop signal indicates that there is nothing to send.

The ARQ-E characters are extended with an identification bit or signal element at the start to indicate whether it is a normal character or a function signal. This would add another possible 32 combinations to the code. But of the 32 only three are used.

An extra symbol labelled α shows a start polarity, and another symbol labelled β indicates a steady stop polarity. So a stream of β characters will be sent if there is nothing else to send. The α and β symbols are called idle signals. The third symbol used is the RQ signal used to request a retransmit.

A seventh bit is added to the character to indicate parity. Odd parity is used so that the number of stop polarity elements (1) is always odd. The parity bit is checked by the receiver to tell if an error has occurred in the transmission of the character. The return channel will include the RQ signal if an error is detected.

Letters shift	figures shift	1 id	2	3	4	5	6	parity 7
A	-	0	1	1	0	0	0	1
B	?	0	1	0	0	1	1	0
C	:	0	0	1	1	1	0	0
D	wru	0	1	0	0	1	0	1
E	3	0	1	0	0	0	0	0
F		0	1	0	1	1	0	0
G		0	0	1	0	1	1	0
H		0	0	0	1	0	1	1
I	8	0	0	1	1	0	0	1
J	bell	0	1	1	0	1	0	0
K	(	0	1	1	1	1	0	1
L	)	0	0	1	0	0	1	1
M	.	0	0	0	1	1	1	0
N	,	0	0	0	1	1	0	1
O	9	0	0	0	0	1	1	1
P	0	0	0	1	1	0	1	0
Q	1	0	1	1	1	0	1	1
R	4	0	0	1	0	1	0	1
S	'	0	1	0	1	0	0	1
T	5	0	0	0	0	0	1	0
U	7	0	1	1	1	0	0	0
V	=	0	0	1	1	1	1	1
W	2	0	1	1	0	0	1	0
X	/	0	1	0	1	1	1	1
Y	6	0	1	0	1	0	1	0
Z	+	0	1	0	0	0	1	1
cr	cr	0	0	0	0	1	0	0
lf	lf	0	0	1	0	0	0	0
ltrs		0	1	1	1	1	1	0
figs		0	1	1	0	1	1	1
space		0	0	0	1	0	0	0
		0	0	0	0	0	0	1
RQ		1	1	1	0	0	0	0
α		1	0	0	0	1	1	0
β		1	0	0	1	0	0	1

ltrs is the symbol to activate the letters shift.

figs is the symbol to activate figures shift.

Space is equivalent to the space bar

cr is carriage return

lf is line feed

cells with blank entries are undefined for international communications, but may have meaning within one country.

== Marking ==
After the five bit characters are extended to seven bit, the polarity may be inverted to form a marking pattern, either every fourth or every eighth character has its 0s and 1s (space and mark elements) transposed. There is also a variation with a cycle length of five characters, to be used when encrypters are in-line.

== Transmission ==
The seven bits resulting are converted from parallel to serial, sending the left-most element first, and then modulated onto a radio carrier, using frequency-shift keying. Standard baud rates are 48, 64, 72, 86, 96, 144, and 192 baud.

== Repeat request ==
When an error is detected in a character received, an RQ symbol is sent, along with a repetition of the last characters in the cycle. When an RQ is received, another RQ is sent along with repeated characters starting from the one flagged as having a problem. The repeated characters would be three in the four character cycle, and seven in the eight character cycle. For the five character cycle, three characters are repeated after two RQ characters. For encrypted characters streams, it is very important to get the position in the sequence precisely correct, and it cannot afford to make a mistake with repeated data.

== Variants ==
Different variants of ARQ-E include ARQ-E3, which uses a different alphabet, ITA3 as in ARQ-M. ARQ-E3 can also be called CCIR 519. ITU standard F.519 introduces this as a variant of ARQ-M, but with one channel. Standard bit rates are 48, 72 and 96 baud.

ARQ-N is similar to ARQ-E but there is no marking pattern.

== Monitoring ==
Software is available for professionals and hobbyists to receive and decode utility transmissions that use ARQ-E. Software includes go2MONITOR which can handle the variants and multipsk, the Rohde & Schwarz GX401DC, the Hoka Code2-32P, and Code200-32, Wavecom, the WiNRADiO Universal FSK Decoder. Early software included Radioraft.
