= Transmission block =

In telecommunications, the term transmission block has the following meanings:

1. A group of characters or bits transmitted as a block, unit, message, or packet. It usually includes additional encoded characters for error detection and correction.
2. In data transmission, a group of records sent, processed, or recorded as a unit.

Some protocols require each transmission block to end with an end-of-message marker. This is often a control character such as End-of-Text (ETX), End-of-Transmission-Block (ETB), or End-of-Transmission (EOT).

Some protocols (especially those requiring ETX) require each transmission block to begin with a Start-of-Text character (STX).

== See also ==
- Frame (networking)
- Network packet
