= Stop-and-wait ARQ =

Basic automatic repeat-request (ARQ) data transmission and error detection protocol

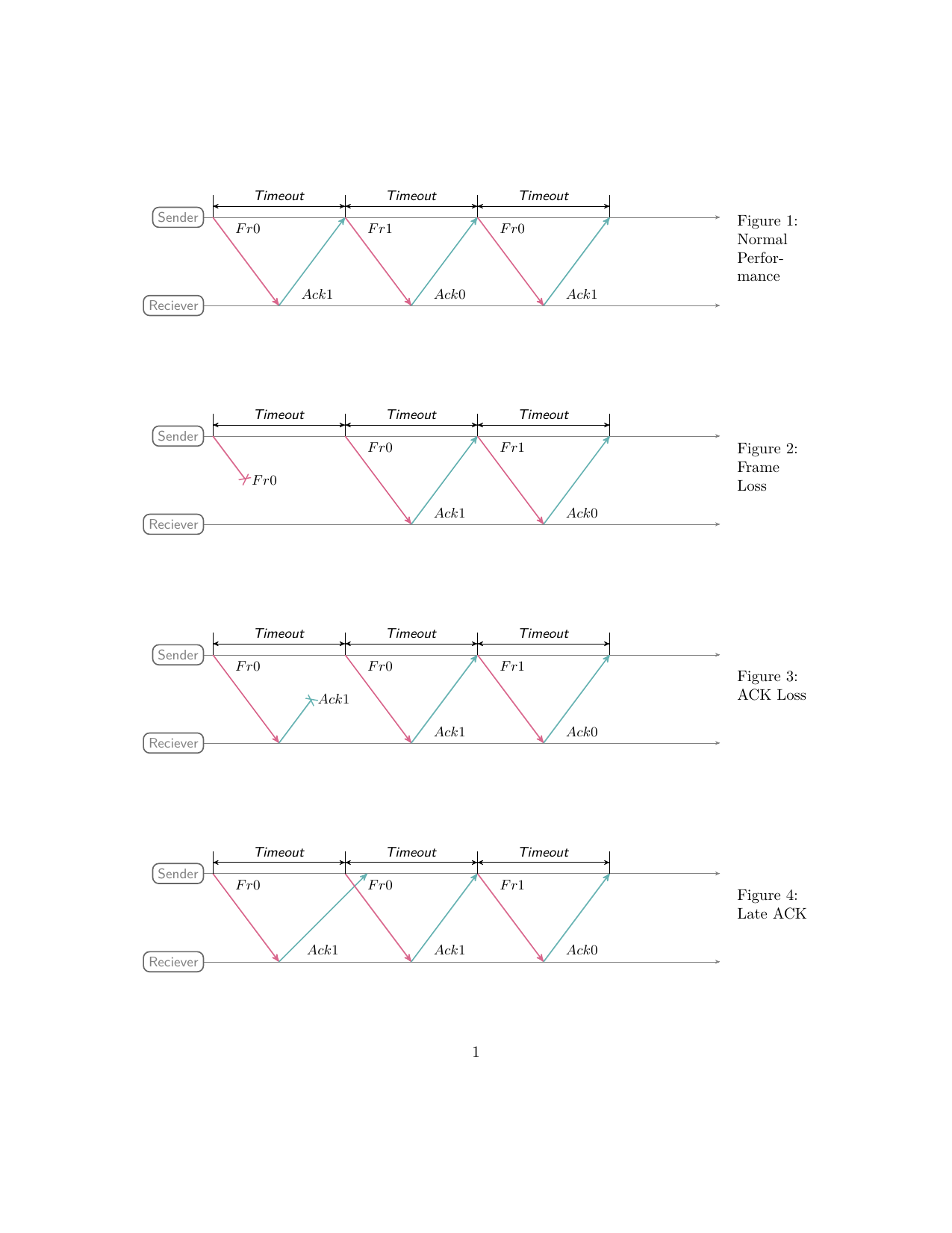
A diagram of the Stop-and-Wait ARQ protocol and its operation in various cases.

Stop-and-wait ARQ, also referred to as alternating bit protocol, is a method in telecommunications to send information between two connected devices. It ensures that information is not lost due to dropped packets and that packets are received in the correct order. It is the simplest automatic repeat-request (ARQ) mechanism. A stop-and-wait ARQ sender sends one frame at a time; it is a special case of the general sliding window protocol with transmit and receive window sizes equal to one in both cases. After sending each frame, the sender does not send any further frames until it receives an acknowledgement (ACK) signal. After receiving a valid frame, the receiver sends an ACK. If the ACK does not reach the sender before a certain time, known as the timeout, the sender sends the same frame again. The timeout countdown is reset after each frame transmission. The above behavior is a basic example of Stop-and-Wait. However, real-life implementations vary to address certain issues of design.

Typically, the transmitter adds a redundancy check number to the end of each frame. The receiver uses the redundancy check number to check for possible damage. If the receiver sees that the frame is good, it sends an ACK. If the receiver sees that the frame is damaged, the receiver discards it and does not send an ACK—pretending that the frame was completely lost, not merely damaged.

One problem is when the ACK sent by the receiver is damaged or lost. In this case, the sender does not receive the ACK, times out, and sends the frame again. Now the receiver has two copies of the same frame, and does not know if the second one is a duplicate frame or the next frame of the sequence carrying identical DATA.

Another problem is when the transmission medium has such a long latency that the sender's timeout runs out before the frame reaches the receiver. In this case, the sender resends the same packet. Eventually, the receiver gets two copies of the same frame and sends an ACK for each one. The sender, waiting for a single ACK, receives two ACKs, which may cause problems if it assumes that the second ACK is for the next frame in the sequence.

To avoid these problems, the most common solution is to define a 1 bit sequence number in the header of the frame. This sequence number alternates (from 0 to 1) in subsequent frames. When the receiver sends an ACK, it includes the sequence number of the next packet it expects. This way, the receiver can detect duplicated frames by checking if the frame sequence numbers alternate. If two subsequent frames have the same sequence number, they are duplicates, and the second frame is discarded. Similarly, if two subsequent ACKs reference the same sequence number, they are acknowledging the same frame.

Stop-and-wait ARQ is inefficient compared to other ARQs, because the time between packets, if the ACK and the data are received successfully, is twice the transit time (assuming the turnaround time can be zero). The throughput on the channel is a fraction of what it could be. To solve this problem, one can send more than one packet at a time with a larger sequence number and use one ACK for a set. This is what is done in Go-Back-N ARQ and the Selective Repeat ARQ.

== See also ==
- Communication protocol
- Data link layer
- Error detection and correction
