= BIP-8 =

BIP-8 (alternatively, BIP8) is an abbreviation for bit-interleaved parity 8. BIP-8 consists of a parity byte calculated bit-wise across a large number of bytes in a transmission transport frame. BIP-8 bits are set such that the overall data stream, including the BIP-8 byte, has even parity. BIP-8 is used in the SONET/SDH and Optical Transport Network standards, as well as in some older PDH framing schemes such as DS3 and E3.

BIP-8 has no error-correcting functionality: like the CRC-6 bits in the much older extended superframe format, it merely provides an approximate method for monitoring link quality at the bit error level.

== See also ==
- Errored second
