= Ethernet over coax =

Telecommunication technology

Ethernet over Coax (EoC) is a family of technologies that supports the transmission of Ethernet frames over coaxial cable. The Institute of Electrical and Electronics Engineers (IEEE) maintains all official Ethernet standards in the IEEE 802 family.

== History ==
The first Ethernet standard, known as 10BASE5 (ThickNet) in the family of IEEE 802.3, specified baseband operation over 50 ohm coaxial cable, which remained the principal medium into the 1980s, when 10BASE2 (ThinNet) coax replaced it in deployments in the 1980s; both being replaced in the 1990s when thinner, cheaper twisted pair cabling came to dominate the market. The use of coaxial cable for Ethernet has been deprecated by the IEEE as of 2011.

Research in Ethernet transmission over coaxial cable continued, as both consumers and telecommunications operators strive to use existing 75 ohm coaxial cable installations (from cable television or CATV), to carry broadband data into and through the home, and into multiple dwelling unit (MDU) installations.

Most EoC technologies are being developed for in-home or on-premises networking and are expected to be operated within the domain of a single operator.

=== Homeplug ===
HomePlug AV as well as its later extension, HomePlug AV2, both operate in a portion of the RF spectrum directly below what is commonly used for terrestrial FM radio broadcasting. HomePlug AV uses BPSK, QPSK, 16 QAM, 64 QAM, 256 QAM, and 1024 QAM modulation strategies between 2 MHz and 30 MHz, while the more recent HomePlug AV2 standard extends the upper bound of its spectral use to 86 MHz.

=== ITU-T G.hn ===
The ITU-T G.hn standard provides high-speed (up to 1 Gigabit/s) local area networking over existing home wires, including coaxial cable, power lines and phone lines. It defines an Application Protocol Convergence (APC) layer for encapsulating standard 802.3 Ethernet frames into G.hn MAC Service Data Units (MSDUs).

Other ITU-T standards for home networking over coaxial cable include G.9954, also known as HomePNA 3.1.

== CATV compatibility ==
EoC research is focused on the use of existing cable television (CATV) infrastructure for Internet access or broadband data transmission for the purpose of being compatible with the existing CATV (or sometimes satellite television) broadcast signals simultaneously transmitted on the same cable. The EoC technologies must operate outside the frequency domain currently used for CATV or for satellite receiver to set-top box transmissions. Most EoC technologies are designed to operate in frequency bands above 1 GHz, which is the upper bound of television signals and for systems designed to operate in North America using the SCTE 55-1 and SCTE 55-2 CATV transmission systems, as well as in most of Europe and portions of Asia. In many localities, CATV systems operate only up to 550 MHz or 750 MHz, wherein some EoC technologies focus on using spectrum between 550 MHz or 750 MHz and 1 GHz. Though less costly, they could potentially conflict with future spectrum expansion up to 1 GHz. Some markets focus on using this 750 MHz to 1 GHz spectrum for EoC, specifically avoiding EoC bands above 1 GHz due to potential ingress noise from over-the-air transmissions and cellular systems.

== See also ==
- DOCSIS - Data Over Cable Service Interface Specification
