= Selective Repeat ARQ =

Data transmission and error correction protocol

Selective Repeat ARQ or Selective Reject ARQ is a specific instance of the automatic repeat request (ARQ) protocol used to manage sequence numbers and retransmissions in reliable communications.

== Summary ==
Selective Repeat is a type of automatic repeat request (ARQ) protocol. With selective repeat, the sender sends a number of frames specified by a window size even without the need to wait for individual ACK from the receiver as in Go-Back-N ARQ. The receiver may selectively reject a single frame, which may be retransmitted alone; this contrasts with other forms of ARQ, which must send every frame from that point again. The receiver accepts out-of-order frames and buffers them. The sender individually retransmits frames that have timed out.

== Concept ==
It may be used as a protocol for the delivery and acknowledgement of message units, or it may be used as a protocol for the delivery of subdivided message sub-units.

When used as the protocol for the delivery of messages, the sending process continues to send a number of frames specified by a window size even after a frame loss. Unlike Go-Back-N ARQ, the receiving process will continue to accept and acknowledge frames sent after an initial error; this is the general case of the sliding window protocol with both transmit and receive window sizes greater than 1.

The receiver process keeps track of the sequence number of the earliest frame it has not received, and sends that number with every acknowledgement (ACK) it sends. If a frame from the sender does not reach the receiver, the sender continues to send subsequent frames until it has emptied its window. The receiver continues to fill its receiving window with the subsequent frames, replying each time with an ACK containing the sequence number of the earliest missing frame. Once the sender has sent all the frames in its window, it re-sends the frame number given by the ACKs, and then continues where it left off.

The size of the sending and receiving windows must be equal, and half the maximum sequence number (assuming that sequence numbers are numbered from 0 to n−1) to avoid miscommunication in all cases of packets being dropped. To understand this, consider the case when all ACKs are destroyed. If the receiving window is larger than half the maximum sequence number, some, possibly even all, of the packets that are present after timeouts are duplicates that are not recognized as such. The sender moves its window for every packet that is acknowledged.

When used as the protocol for the delivery of subdivided messages it works somewhat differently. In non-continuous channels where messages may be variable in length, standard ARQ or Hybrid ARQ protocols may treat the message as a single unit. Alternately selective retransmission may be employed in conjunction with the basic ARQ mechanism where the message is first subdivided into sub-blocks (typically of fixed length) in a process called packet segmentation. The original variable length message is thus represented as a concatenation of a variable number of sub-blocks. While in standard ARQ the message as a whole is either acknowledged (ACKed) or negatively acknowledged (NAKed), in ARQ with selective transmission the ACK response would additionally carry a bit flag indicating the identity of each sub-block successfully received. In ARQ with selective retransmission of sub-divided messages each retransmission diminishes in length, needing to only contain the sub-blocks that were linked.

In most channel models with variable length messages, the probability of error-free reception diminishes in inverse proportion with increasing message length. In other words, it's easier to receive a short message than a longer message. Therefore, standard ARQ techniques involving variable length messages have increased difficulty delivering longer messages, as each repeat is the full length. Selective re-transmission applied to variable length messages completely eliminates the difficulty in delivering longer messages, as successfully delivered sub-blocks are retained after each transmission, and the number of outstanding sub-blocks in following transmissions diminishes. Selective Repeat is implemented in UDP transmission.

== Pseudocode ==
These examples assume an infinite number of sequence and request numbers.

N  := window size
Rn := request number
Sn := sequence number
Sb := sequence base
Sm := sequence max
buffer[] := buffer to store out-of-order packets


function receiver is
    Rn := 0
    buffer := empty
    Do the following forever:
        if the packet received is error-free and Sn = Rn then
            Accept the packet and send it to a higher layer
            Rn := Rn + 1

            while buffer[Rn] exists do
                Accept the packet from the buffer and send it to a higher layer
                Remove packet Rn from the buffer
                Rn := Rn + 1
            
        else if the packet received is error-free and Sn > Rn then
            Buffer the packet at position Sn
        else
            Ignore packet
        Send a Request for Rn


function sender is
    Sb := 0
    Sm := N + 1
    buffer := empty

    Repeat the following steps forever:
        if you receive a request number where Rn > Sb then
            Sm := (Sm − Sb) + Rn
            Sb := Rn

            Remove packets with Sn < Rn from the buffer

        if no packet is in transmission then
            Transmit a packet where Sb ≤ Sn < Sm
            Store the transmitted packet in the buffer

        for each packet Sn in buffer do
            if packet Sn timeout occurred then
                Retransmit packet Sn

== Choosing a window size (N) ==
There are a few things to keep in mind when choosing a value for N in Selective Repeat ARQ:

1. The sender must not transmit faster than the receiver can handle. N should be bounded by the receiver’s capacity to process and buffer out-of-order packets.
2. N must be less than half the total number of sequence numbers (if they are numbered from zero to the maximum value of the sequence number space) to avoid ambiguity in detecting duplicate packets and dropped acknowledgments.
3. Considering the constraints in (1) and (2), choose N to be as large as possible to maximize throughput.

== Examples ==
The Transmission Control Protocol uses a variant of Go-Back-N ARQ to ensure reliable transmission of data over the Internet Protocol, which does not provide guaranteed delivery of packets; with Selective Acknowledgement (SACK) extension, it may also use Selective Repeat ARQ.

The ITU-T G.hn standard, which provides a way to create a high-speed (up to 1 Gigabit/s) Local area network using existing home wiring (power lines, phone lines and coaxial cables), uses Selective Repeat ARQ to ensure reliable transmission over noisy media. G.hn employs packet segmentation to sub-divide messages into smaller units, to increase the probability that each one is received correctly.

The STANAG 5066 Profile for High Frequency (HF) Radio Data Communication uses selective repeat ARQ, with a maximum window size of 128 protocol-data units (PDUs).

== See also ==
- Go-Back-N ARQ
- Reliable Data Transfer
- Pipeline (software)
- Automatic repeat request
- Computer networking
