= Joint quantum entropy =

Measure of information in quantum information theory

The joint quantum entropy generalizes the classical joint entropy to the context of quantum information theory. Intuitively, given two quantum states $\rho$ and $\sigma$, represented as density operators that are subparts of a quantum system, the joint quantum entropy is a measure of the total uncertainty or entropy of the joint system. It is written $S(\rho,\sigma)$ or $H(\rho,\sigma)$, depending on the notation being used for the von Neumann entropy. Like other entropies, the joint quantum entropy is measured in bits, i.e. the logarithm is taken in base 2.

In this article, we will use $S(\rho,\sigma)$ for the joint quantum entropy.

== Background ==
In information theory, for any classical random variable $X$, the classical Shannon entropy $H(X)$ is a measure of how uncertain we are about the outcome of $X$. For example, if $X$ is a probability distribution concentrated at one point, the outcome of $X$ is certain and therefore its entropy $H(X)=0$. At the other extreme, if $X$ is the uniform probability distribution with $n$ possible values, intuitively one would expect $X$ is associated with the most uncertainty. Indeed, such uniform probability distributions have maximum possible entropy $H(X) = \log_2(n)$.

In quantum information theory, the notion of entropy is extended from probability distributions to quantum states, or density matrices. For a state $\rho$, the von Neumann entropy is defined by

$$- \operatorname{Tr} \rho \log \rho.$$

Applying the spectral theorem, or Borel functional calculus for infinite dimensional systems, we see that it generalizes the classical entropy. The physical meaning remains the same. A maximally mixed state, the quantum analog of the uniform probability distribution, has maximum von Neumann entropy. On the other hand, a pure state, or a rank one projection, will have zero von Neumann entropy. We write the von Neumann entropy $S(\rho)$ (or sometimes $H(\rho)$.

== Definition ==
Given a quantum system with two subsystems A and B, the term joint quantum entropy simply refers to the von Neumann entropy of the combined system. This is to distinguish from the entropy of the subsystems. In symbols, if the combined system is in state $\rho^{AB}$,

the joint quantum entropy is then

$$S(\rho^A,\rho^B) = S(\rho^{AB}) = -\operatorname{Tr}(\rho^{AB}\log(\rho^{AB})).$$

Each subsystem has its own entropy. The state of the subsystems are given by the partial trace operation.

== Properties ==
The classical joint entropy is always at least equal to the entropy of each individual system. This is not the case for the joint quantum entropy. If the quantum state $\rho^{AB}$ exhibits quantum entanglement, then the entropy of each subsystem may be larger than the joint entropy. This is equivalent to the fact that the conditional quantum entropy may be negative, while the classical conditional entropy may never be.

Consider a maximally entangled state such as a Bell state. If $\rho^{AB}$ is a Bell state, say,

$$\left| \Psi \right\rangle = \frac{1}{\sqrt{2}}\left(|00\rangle + |11\rangle\right),$$

then the total system is a pure state, with entropy 0, while each individual subsystem is a maximally mixed state, with maximum von Neumann entropy $\log 2 = 1$. Thus the joint entropy of the combined system is less than that of subsystems. This is because for entangled states, definite states cannot be assigned to subsystems, resulting in positive entropy.

Notice that the above phenomenon cannot occur if a state is a separable pure state. In that case, the reduced states of the subsystems are also pure. Therefore, all entropies are zero.

== Relations to other entropy measures ==
The joint quantum entropy $S(\rho^{AB})$ can be used to define of the conditional quantum entropy:

$$S(\rho^A|\rho^B) \ \stackrel{\mathrm{def}}{=}\  S(\rho^A,\rho^B) - S(\rho^B)$$

and the quantum mutual information:

$$I(\rho^A:\rho^B) \ \stackrel{\mathrm{def}}{=}\  S(\rho^A) + S(\rho^B) - S(\rho^A,\rho^B)$$

These definitions parallel the use of the classical joint entropy to define the conditional entropy and mutual information.

== See also ==
- Quantum relative entropy
- Quantum mutual information
