= Variation of information =

Measure of distance between two clusterings related to mutual information

In probability theory and information theory, the variation of information or shared information distance is a measure of the distance between two clusterings (partitions of elements). It is closely related to mutual information; indeed, it is a simple linear expression involving the mutual information. Unlike the mutual information, however, the variation of information is a true metric, in that it obeys the triangle inequality.

Information diagram illustrating the relation between information entropies, mutual information and variation of information.

== Definition ==
Suppose we have two partitions $X$ and $Y$ of a set $A$, namely $X = \{X_{1}, X_{2}, \ldots, X_{k}\}$ and $Y = \{Y_{1}, Y_{2}, \ldots, Y_{l}\}$.

Let:

$$n = \sum_{i} |X_{i}| = \sum_{j} |Y_{j}|=|A|$$
$p_{i} = |X_{i}| / n$ and $q_{j} = |Y_{j}| / n$
$$r_{ij} = |X_i\cap Y_{j}| / n$$

Then the variation of information between the two partitions is:

$$\mathrm{VI}(X; Y ) = - \sum_{i,j} r_{ij} \left[\log(r_{ij}/p_i)+\log(r_{ij}/q_j) \right]$$.

This is equivalent to the shared information distance between the random variables i and j with respect to the uniform probability measure on $A$ defined by $\mu(B):=|B|/n$ for $B\subseteq A$.

=== Explicit information content ===
We can rewrite this definition in terms that explicitly highlight the information content of this metric.

The set of all partitions of a set form a compact lattice where the partial order induces two operations, the meet $\wedge$ and the join $\vee$, where the maximum $\overline{\mathrm{1}}$ is the partition with only one block, i.e., all elements grouped together, and the minimum is $\overline{\mathrm{0}}$, the partition consisting of all elements as singletons. The meet of two partitions $X$ and $Y$ is easy to understand as that partition formed by all pair intersections of one block of, $X_{i}$, of $X$ and one, $Y_{i}$, of $Y$. It then follows that $X\wedge Y\subseteq X$ and $X\wedge Y\subseteq Y$.

Let's define the entropy of a partition $X$ as

$$H\left( X\right)\,=\,-\sum_i\,p_{i}\log p_{i}$$,

where $p_{i}=|X_i|/n$. Clearly, $H(\overline{\mathrm{1}})=0$ and $H(\overline{\mathrm{0}})=\log\,n$. The entropy of a partition is a monotonous function on the lattice of partitions in the sense that $X\subseteq Y\Rightarrow H(X) \geq H(Y)$.

Then the VI distance between $X$ and $Y$ is given by

$$\mathrm{VI}(X,Y)\,=\,2 H( X\wedge Y )\,-\,H(X)\,-\,H(Y)$$.

The difference $d(X,Y)\equiv |H\left(X\right)-H\left(Y\right)|$ is a pseudo-metric as $d(X,Y)=0$ doesn't necessarily imply that $X=Y$. From the definition of $\overline{\mathrm{1}}$, it is $\mathrm{VI}(X,\mathrm{1})\,=\,H\left(X\right)$.

If in the Hasse diagram we draw an edge from every partition to the maximum $\overline{\mathrm{1}}$ and assign it a weight equal to the VI distance between the given partition and $\overline{\mathrm{1}}$, we can interpret the VI distance as basically an average of differences of edge weights to the maximum

$$\mathrm{VI}(X,Y)\,=\,|\mathrm{VI}(X,\overline{\mathrm{1}})\,-\,\mathrm{VI}(X\wedge Y,\overline{\mathrm{1}})|\,+\,|\mathrm{VI}(Y,\overline{\mathrm{1}})\,-\,\mathrm{VI}(X\wedge Y,\overline{\mathrm{1}})| \,=\,d(X,X\wedge Y)\,+\,d(Y,X\wedge Y)$$.

For $H(X)$ as defined above, it holds that the joint information of two partitions coincides with the entropy of the meet

$$H(X,Y)\,=\,H(X\wedge Y)$$

and we also have that $d(X,X\wedge Y)\,=\,H(X\wedge Y|X)$ coincides with the conditional entropy of the meet (intersection) $X\wedge Y$ relative to $X$.

== Identities ==
The variation of information satisfies

$$\mathrm{VI}(X; Y ) = H(X) + H(Y) - 2I(X, Y)$$,

where $H(X)$ is the entropy of $X$, and $I(X, Y)$ is mutual information between $X$ and $Y$ with respect to the uniform probability measure on $A$. This can be rewritten as

$$\mathrm{VI}(X; Y ) = H(X,Y) - I(X, Y)$$,

where $H(X,Y)$ is the joint entropy of $X$ and $Y$, or

$$\mathrm{VI}(X; Y ) = H(X|Y) + H(Y|X)$$,

where $H(X|Y)$ and $H(Y|X)$ are the respective conditional entropies.

The variation of information can also be bounded, either in terms of the number of elements:

$$\mathrm{VI}(X; Y)\leq \log(n)$$,

Or with respect to a maximum number of clusters, $K^*$:

$$\mathrm{VI}(X ; Y) \leq 2 \log(K^*)$$

=== Triangle inequality ===
To verify the triangle inequality $\mathrm{VI}(X; Z ) \leq \mathrm{VI}(X; Y ) + \mathrm{VI}(Y; Z)$, expand using the identity $\mathrm{VI}(X; Y ) = H(X|Y) + H(Y|X)$. It suffices to prove $H(X | Z) \leq H(X | Y) + H(Y | Z)$The right side has a lower bound $H(X | Y) + H(Y | Z) \geq H(X|Y, Z) + H(Y|Z) = H(X, Y|Z)$ which is no less than the left side.
