= Chain rule (disambiguation) =

The chain rule in calculus is the formula for the derivative/differentiation of a composition of functions or operations.

Chain rule may also refer to other formulas/equations:

- Cyclic chain rule (AKA Euler's chain rule, triple product rule, cyclic relation, reciprocity theorem), relating partial derivatives of three interdependent variables
- Finding a property of 'X and Y' by combining the same property of 'X' and 'Y given X':
  - Chain rule (probability) (AKA general product rule), for the chance of multiple events all occurring (their intersection) or the joint distribution of random variables
  - Chain rule for Kolmogorov complexity, for the minimum size of a program that produces a certain output, given programs for computing the start and the remainder
  - Chain rule for entropy (information theory), for the Shannon entropy of two consecutive experiments

== See also ==
- Reverse chain rule (AKA integration by substitution, u-substitution, change of variables), the related method for evaluating integrals and antiderivatives
