= State-dependent information =

State-dependent measures that converge to the mutual information

In information theory, state-dependent information is the generic name given to the family of state-dependent measures that in expectation converge to the mutual information.

State-dependent informations often appear in neuroscience applications.

Let $X$ and $Y$ be random variables and $y$ be a state within $Y$. The state-dependent information between a random variable $X$ and a state $Y=y$ is written as $I( X ; Y = y)$. There are currently three known varieties of state-dependent information: specific-surprise, specific-information, and state-specific-information.

== Specific-Surprise ==
The specific-surprise, $\mathrm{I_{ss}}$, is defined by a Kullback–Leibler divergence,

$$\mathrm{I_{ss}}(X;Y=y) \equiv \mathrm{D_{KL}}[ P_{X|y} \parallel P_{X} ]$$.

As a special case of the chain-rule for Kullback-Liebler divergerences, specific-surprise follows the chain-rule for variables. Using $Z$ as a random variable, this is specifically,

$$\mathrm{I_{ss}}(XZ;Y=y) = \mathrm{I_{ss}}(X;Y=y) + \mathrm{I_{ss}}(Z;Y=y|X)$$.

Intuitively, specific-surprise is thought of as "how much did my beliefs about $X$ change upon learning that $Y=y$”? Which is zero when there's no change. It is nonnegative. Specific-surprise has also been called "Bayesian Surprise".

== Specific-Information ==
The specific-information, $\mathrm{I_{si}}$, is defined by a difference of entropies,

$$\mathrm{I_{si}}(X;Y=y) \equiv \mathrm{H}(X) - \mathrm{H}(X|Y=y)$$.

Specific-information follows the chain-rule for states. Using a state $z \in Z$ as a state of random variable $Z$, this is specifically,

$$\mathrm{I_{si}}(X;YZ=yz) = \mathrm{I_{si}}(X;Y=y) + \mathrm{I_{si}}(X;Z=z|Y=y)$$.

Specific-information is interpreted as "how did the uncertainty about $X$ change upon learning $Y=y$?" This can be in the positive or negative. When $X$ follows a uniform distribution, the $\mathrm{I_{ss}}$ and $\mathrm{I_{si}}$ are equivalent.

== State-Specific-Information ==
The state-specific information, $\mathrm{I_{ssi}}$, is a synonym for the Pointwise mutual information.
