= Pointwise mutual information =

Information Theory

In statistics, probability theory and information theory, pointwise mutual information (PMI), or point mutual information, is a measure of association. It compares the probability of two events occurring together to what this probability would be if the events were independent.

PMI (especially in its positive pointwise mutual information variant) has been described as "one of the most important concepts in NLP", where it "draws on the intuition that the best way to weigh the association between two words is to ask how much more the two words co-occur in [a] corpus than we would have expected them to appear by chance."

The concept was introduced in 1961 by Robert Fano under the name of "mutual information", but today that term is instead used for a related measure of dependence between random variables: The mutual information (MI) of two discrete random variables refers to the average PMI of all possible events.

== Definition ==
The PMI of a pair of outcomes x and y belonging to discrete random variables X and Y quantifies the discrepancy between the probability of their coincidence given their joint distribution and their individual distributions, assuming independence. Mathematically:

$$\operatorname{pmi}(x;y) \equiv \log_2\frac{p(x,y)}{p(x)p(y)} = \log_2\frac{p(x|y)}{p(x)} = \log_2\frac{p(y|x)}{p(y)}$$

(with the latter two expressions being equal to the first by Bayes' theorem). The mutual information (MI) of the random variables X and Y is the expected value of the PMI (over all possible outcomes).

The measure is symmetric ($\operatorname{pmi}(x;y)=\operatorname{pmi}(y;x)$). It can take positive or negative values, but is zero if X and Y are independent. Note that even though PMI may be negative or positive, its expected outcome over all joint events (MI) is non-negative. PMI maximizes when X and Y are perfectly associated (i.e. $p(x|y)$ or $p(y|x)=1$), yielding the following bounds:

$$-\infty \leq \operatorname{pmi}(x;y) \leq \min\left[ -\log p(x), -\log p(y) \right] .$$

Finally, $\operatorname{pmi}(x;y)$ will increase if $p(x|y)$ is fixed but $p(x)$ decreases.

Here is an example to illustrate:

x	y	p(x, y)
0	0	0.1
0	1	0.7
1	0	0.15
1	1	0.05

Using this table we can marginalize to get the following additional table for the individual distributions:

	p(x)	p(y)
0	0.8	0.25
1	0.2	0.75

With this example, we can compute four values for $\operatorname{pmi}(x;y)$. Using base-2 logarithms:

$\operatorname{pmi}(x=0;y=0)=-1$
$\operatorname{pmi}(x=0;y=1)=0.222392$
$\operatorname{pmi}(x=1;y=0)=1.584963$
$\operatorname{pmi}(x=1;y=1)=-1.584963$

(For reference, the mutual information $\operatorname{I}(X;Y)$ would then be 0.2141709.)

== Similarities to mutual information ==
Pointwise Mutual Information has many of the same relationships as the mutual information. In particular,

$$\begin{align}
\operatorname{pmi}(x;y) &=& h(x) + h(y) - h(x,y) \\
&=& h(x) - h(x \mid y) \\
&=& h(y) - h(y \mid x)
\end{align}$$

Where $h(x)$ is the self-information, or $-\log_2 p(x)$.

== Variants ==
Several variations of PMI have been proposed, in particular to address what has been described as its "two main limitations":

1. PMI can take both positive and negative values and has no fixed bounds, which makes it harder to interpret.
2. PMI has "a well-known tendency to give higher scores to low-frequency events", but in applications such as measuring word similarity, it is preferable to have "a higher score for pairs of words whose relatedness is supported by more evidence."

=== Positive PMI ===
The positive pointwise mutual information (PPMI) measure is defined by setting negative values of PMI to zero:

$\operatorname{ppmi}(x;y) \equiv \max\left(\log_2\frac{p(x,y)}{p(x)p(y)},0\right)$

This definition is motivated by the observation that "negative PMI values (which imply things are co-occurring less often than we would expect by chance) tend to be unreliable unless our corpora are enormous" and also by a concern that "it's not clear whether it's even possible to evaluate such scores of 'unrelatedness' with human judgment". It also avoids having to deal with $-\infty$ values for events that never occur together ($p(x,y)=0$), by setting PPMI for these to 0.

=== Normalized pointwise mutual information (npmi) ===
Pointwise mutual information can be normalized between [-1,+1] resulting in -1 (in the limit) for never occurring together, 0 for independence, and +1 for complete co-occurrence.

$\operatorname{npmi}(x;y) = \frac{\operatorname{pmi}(x;y)}{h(x, y) }$

Where $h(x,y)$ is the joint self-information $-\log_2 p(x,y)$.

=== PMI^{k} family ===
The PMI^{k} measure (for k=2, 3 etc.), which was introduced by Béatrice Daille around 1994, and as of 2011 was described as being "among the most widely used variants", is defined as

$\operatorname{pmi}^k(x;y) \equiv \log_2\frac{p(x,y)^k}{p(x)p(y)} = \operatorname{pmi}(x;y)-(-(k-1) \log_2 p(x,y))$

In particular, $pmi^1(x;y) = pmi(x;y)$. The additional factors of $p(x,y)$ inside the logarithm are intended to correct the bias of PMI towards low-frequency events, by boosting the scores of frequent pairs. A 2011 case study demonstrated the success of PMI^{3} in correcting this bias on a corpus drawn from English Wikipedia. Taking x to be the word "football", its most strongly associated words y according to the PMI measure (i.e. those maximizing $pmi(x;y)$) were domain-specific ("midfielder", "cornerbacks", "goalkeepers") whereas the terms ranked most highly by PMI^{3} were much more general ("league", "clubs", "england").

=== Specific correlation ===
Total correlation is an extension of mutual information to multi-variables. Analogously to the definition of total correlation, the extension of PMI to multi-variables is "specific correlation". The SI of the results of random variables $\boldsymbol{x} = ( x_{1}, x_{2}, \ldots{}, x_{n})$ is expressed as the following:

$$\mathrm{SI}( x_{1}, x_{2}, \ldots, x_{n} )
\equiv \log \frac{ p(x_{1}, x_{2}, \ldots, x_{n}) }{ \prod_{i=1}^n p(x_{i}) }
=
\log p(\boldsymbol{x})-\log \prod_{i=1}^n p\left(x_i\right)$$

== Chain-rule ==
Like mutual information, point mutual information follows the chain rule, that is,

$$\operatorname{pmi}(x;yz) = \operatorname{pmi}(x;y) + \operatorname{pmi}(x;z|y)$$

This is proven through application of Bayes' theorem:

$$\begin{align}
\operatorname{pmi}(x;y) + \operatorname{pmi}(x;z|y) & {} = \log\frac{p(x,y)}{p(x)p(y)} + \log\frac{p(x,z|y)}{p(x|y)p(z|y)} \\
& {} = \log \left[ \frac{p(x,y)}{p(x)p(y)} \frac{p(x,z|y)}{p(x|y)p(z|y)} \right] \\
& {} = \log \frac{p(x|y)p(y)p(x,z|y)}{p(x)p(y)p(x|y)p(z|y)} \\
& {} = \log \frac{p(x,yz)}{p(x)p(yz)} \\
& {} = \operatorname{pmi}(x;yz)
\end{align}$$

== Applications ==
PMI could be used in various disciplines e.g. in information theory, linguistics or chemistry (in profiling and analysis of chemical compounds). In computational linguistics, PMI has been used for finding collocations and associations between words. For instance, countings of occurrences and co-occurrences of words in a text corpus can be used to approximate the probabilities $p(x)$ and $p(x,y)$ respectively. The following table shows counts of pairs of words getting the most and the least PMI scores in the first 50 millions of words in Wikipedia (dump of October 2015) filtering by 1,000 or more co-occurrences. The frequency of each count can be obtained by dividing its value by 50,000,952. (Note: natural log is used to calculate the PMI values in this example, instead of log base 2)

word 1	word 2	count word 1	count word 2	count of co-occurrences	PMI
puerto	rico	1938	1311	1159	10.0349081703
hong	kong	2438	2694	2205	9.72831972408
los	angeles	3501	2808	2791	9.56067615065
carbon	dioxide	4265	1353	1032	9.09852946116
prize	laureate	5131	1676	1210	8.85870710982
san	francisco	5237	2477	1779	8.83305176711
nobel	prize	4098	5131	2498	8.68948811416
ice	hockey	5607	3002	1933	8.6555759741
star	trek	8264	1594	1489	8.63974676575
car	driver	5578	2749	1384	8.41470768304
it	the	283891	3293296	3347	-1.72037278119
are	of	234458	1761436	1019	-2.09254205335
this	the	199882	3293296	1211	-2.38612756961
is	of	565679	1761436	1562	-2.54614706831
and	of	1375396	1761436	2949	-2.79911817902
a	and	984442	1375396	1457	-2.92239510038
in	and	1187652	1375396	1537	-3.05660070757
to	and	1025659	1375396	1286	-3.08825363041
to	in	1025659	1187652	1066	-3.12911348956
of	and	1761436	1375396	1190	-3.70663100173

Good collocation pairs have high PMI because the probability of co-occurrence is only slightly lower than the probabilities of occurrence of each word. Conversely, a pair of words whose probabilities of occurrence are considerably higher than their probability of co-occurrence gets a small PMI score.

== See also ==
- State-dependent information
