= A Mathematical Theory of Communication =

1948 scholarly article by Claude Shannon

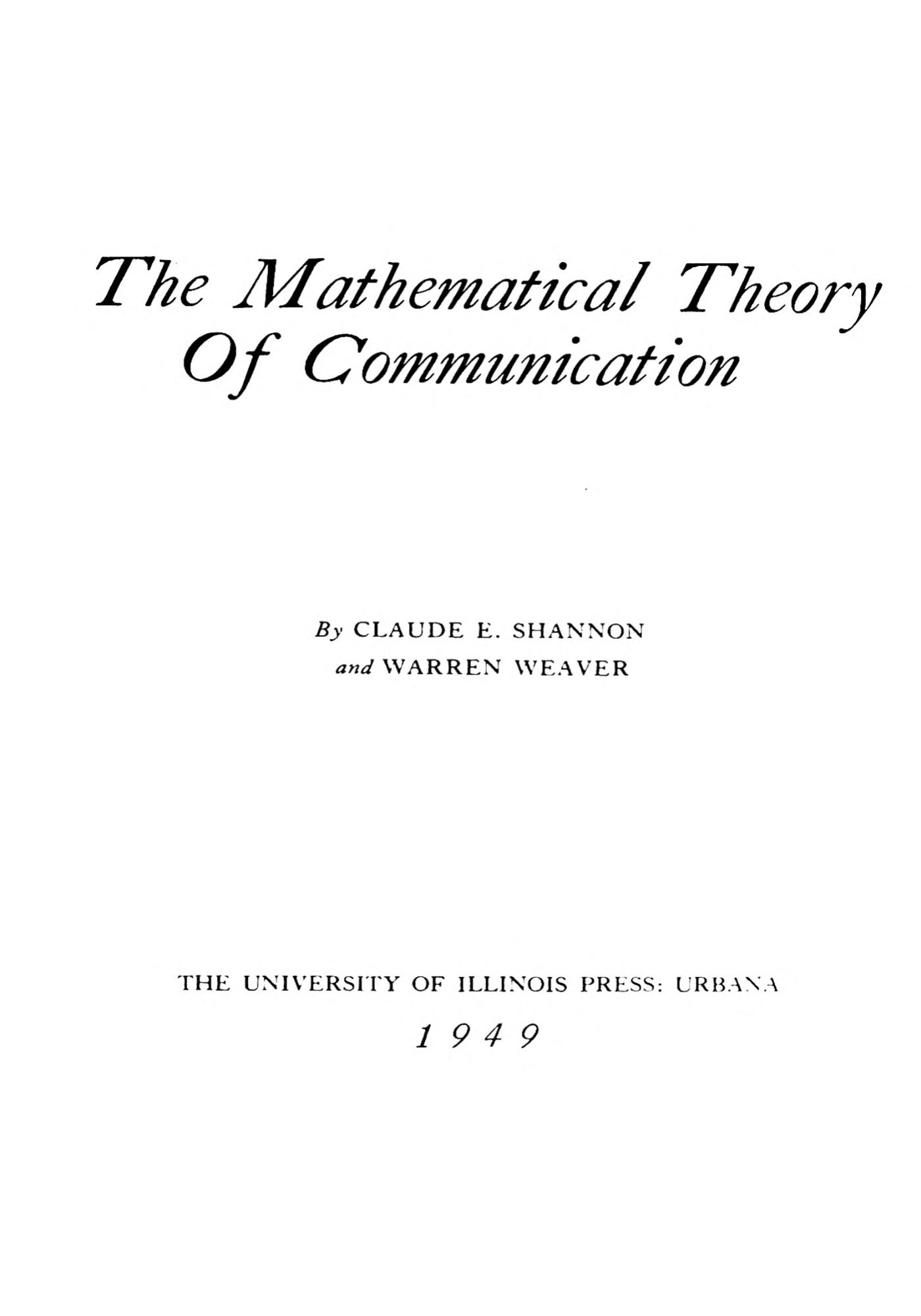
- 1949 full book edition
- Author: Claude E. Shannon
- Language: English
- Subject: Communication theory
- Publication date: 1948
- Publication place: United States

"A Mathematical Theory of Communication" is an article by mathematician Claude Shannon published in Bell System Technical Journal in 1948. It was renamed The Mathematical Theory of Communication in the 1949 book of the same name, a small but significant title change after realizing the generality of this work. It has tens of thousands of citations, being one of the most influential and cited scientific papers of all time, as it gave rise to the field of information theory, with Scientific American referring to the paper as the "Magna Carta of the Information Age", while the electrical engineer Robert G. Gallager called the paper a "blueprint for the digital era". Historian James Gleick rated the paper as the most important development of 1948, placing the transistor second in the same time period, with Gleick emphasizing that the paper by Shannon was "even more profound and more fundamental" than the transistor.

It is also noted that "as did relativity and quantum theory, information theory radically changed the way scientists look at the universe". The paper also formally introduced the term "bit" and serves as its theoretical foundation.

== Publication ==
The article was the founding work of the field of information theory. It was later published in 1949 as a book titled The Mathematical Theory of Communication (ISBN 0-252-72546-8), later published as a paperback in 1963 (ISBN 0-252-72548-4). The book contains an additional article by Warren Weaver, providing an overview of the theory for a more general audience.

== Contents ==
Shannon's diagram of a general communications system, showing the process by which a message sent becomes the message received (possibly corrupted by noise)

This work is known for introducing the concepts of channel capacity as well as the noisy channel coding theorem.

Shannon's article laid out the basic elements of communication:

- An information source that produces a message
- A transmitter that operates on the message to create a signal which can be sent through a channel
- A channel, which is the medium over which the signal, carrying the information that composes the message, is sent
- A receiver, which transforms the signal back into the message intended for delivery
- A destination, which can be a person or a machine, for whom or which the message is intended

It also developed the concepts of information entropy, redundancy and the source coding theorem, and introduced the term bit (which Shannon credited to John Tukey) as a unit of information. It was also in this paper that the Shannon–Fano coding technique was proposed – a technique developed in conjunction with Robert Fano.

== See also ==
- List of computer books
- List of mathematics books
