= Jacob Wolfowitz =

American statistician (born 1910)

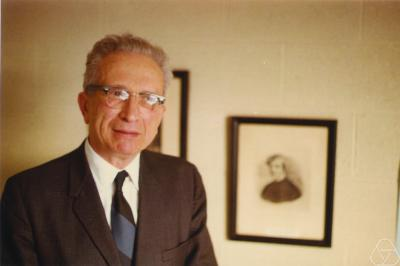
- Wolfowitz in 1970
- Born: March 19, 1910; Warsaw, Congress Poland, Russian Empire
- Died: July 16, 1981 (aged 71); Tampa, Florida, U.S.
- Education: City University of New York; New York University
- Known for: Wald–Wolfowitz runs test Dvoretzky–Kiefer–Wolfowitz inequality
- Spouse: Lillian Dundes
- Children: Laura, Paul Wolfowitz
- Scientific career
- Fields: Statistics
- Institutions: Cornell University; Columbia University; University of Illinois Urbana-Champaign; University of South Florida
- Doctoral advisor: Donald Flanders
- Doctoral students: Albert H. Bowker; Jack Kiefer; Gottfried E. Noether; Howard Levene; Samuel Kotz

Jacob Wolfowitz (March 19, 1910 – July 16, 1981) was a Polish-born American Jewish statistician and Shannon Award-winning information theorist. He was the father of former United States Deputy Secretary of Defense and World Bank Group President Paul Wolfowitz.

== Early life and education ==
Wolfowitz was born in 1910 in Warsaw, Poland, the son of Helen (Pearlman) and Samuel Wolfowitz. He emigrated with his parents to the United States in 1920. He received a bachelor of science in 1931 from the City College of New York.

== Career ==
In the mid-1930s, Wolfowitz began his career as a high school mathematics teacher and continued teaching until 1942 when he received his Ph.D. degree in mathematics from New York University. While a part-time graduate student, Wolfowitz met Abraham Wald, with whom he collaborated in numerous joint papers in the field of mathematical statistics. This collaboration continued until Wald's death in an airplane crash in 1950. In 1951, Wolfowitz became a professor of mathematics at Cornell University, where he stayed until 1970. From 1970 to 1978 he was at the University of Illinois Urbana-Champaign. He died of a heart attack in Tampa, Florida, where he had become a professor at the University of South Florida after retiring from Illinois.

Wolfowitz's main contributions were in the fields of statistical decision theory, non-parametric statistics, sequential analysis, and information theory.

One of his results is the strong converse to Claude Shannon's coding theorem. While Shannon could prove only that the block error probability can not become arbitrarily small if the transmission rate is above the channel capacity, Wolfowitz proved that the block error rate actually converges to one. As a consequence, Shannon's original result is today termed "the weak theorem" (sometimes also Shannon's "conjecture" by some authors).
