= Robert Fano =

Italian-American computer scientist

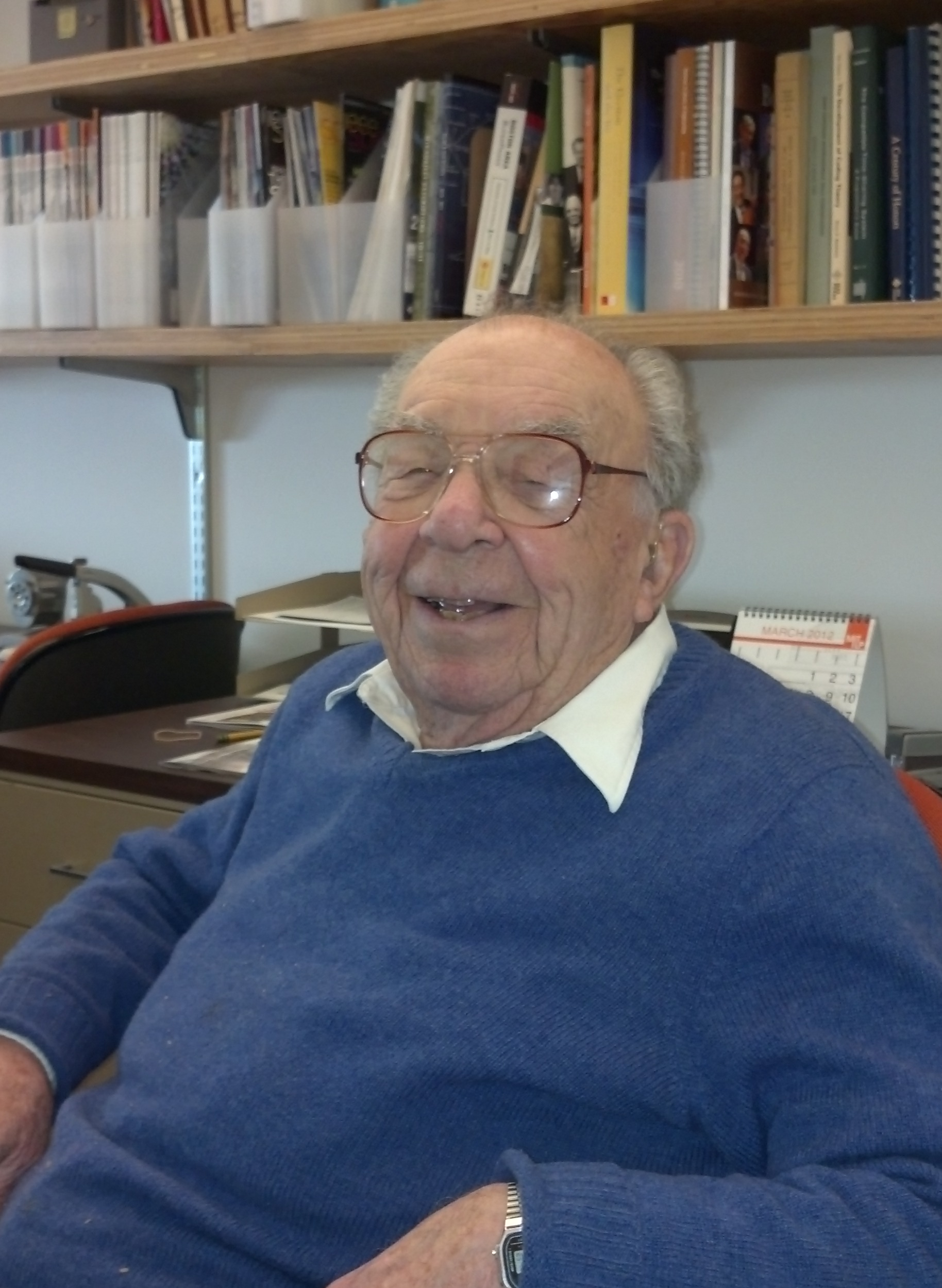
- Prof. Fano in his office at MIT in 2012
- Born: Roberto Mario Fano; 11 November 1917; Turin, Italy
- Died: 13 July 2016 (aged 98); Naples, Florida
- Citizenship: United States of America
- Education: MIT
- Known for: Fano algorithm Fano metric Fano's inequality Shannon–Fano coding Pointwise mutual information Founder of Project MAC
- Relatives: Ugo Fano (brother)
- Awards: IEEE James H. Mulligan Jr. Education Medal (1977); Shannon Award (1976); IEEE Fellow (1954)
- Scientific career
- Fields: computer science, information theory
- Workplaces: Massachusetts Institute of Technology
- Thesis: Theoretical Limitations on the Broadband Matching of Arbitrary Impedances (1947)
- Doctoral advisor: Ernst Guillemin
- Doctoral students: John Wozencraft

Roberto Mario "Robert" Fano (11 November 1917 – 13 July 2016) was an Italian-American computer scientist and professor of electrical engineering and computer science at the Massachusetts Institute of Technology. He became a student and working lab partner to Claude Shannon, whom he admired zealously and assisted in the early years of information theory.

== Early life and education ==
Fano was born in Turin, Italy in 1917 to a Jewish family and grew up in Turin. Fano's father was the mathematician Gino Fano, his older brother was the physicist Ugo Fano, and the physicist-mathematician Giulio Racah was a cousin. Fano studied engineering as an undergraduate at the School of Engineering of Torino (Politecnico di Torino) until 1939, when he emigrated to the United States as a result of anti-Jewish legislation passed under Benito Mussolini. He received his S.B. in electrical engineering from MIT in 1941, and upon graduation joined the staff of the MIT Radiation Laboratory. After World War II, Fano continued to complete his Sc.D. in electrical engineering from MIT in 1947. His thesis, titled Theoretical Limitations on the Broadband Matching of Arbitrary Impedances, was supervised by Ernst Guillemin.

== Career ==
Fano's career spanned three areas: microwave systems, information theory, and computer science.

Fano joined the MIT faculty in 1947 to what was then called the Department of Electrical Engineering. Between 1950 and 1953, he led the Radar Techniques Group at Lincoln Laboratory. In 1954, Fano was made an IEEE Fellow for "contributions in the field of information theory and microwave filters". He was elected to the American Academy of Arts and Sciences in 1958, to the National Academy of Engineering in 1973, and to the National Academy of Sciences in 1978.

Fano was known principally for his work on information theory. He developed Shannon–Fano coding in collaboration with Claude Shannon, and derived the Fano inequality. He also invented the Fano algorithm and postulated the Fano metric. One of Fano's students was David A. Huffman, who developed Huffman coding at the age of 25 when challenged by Fano to design an improved coding scheme as an alternative to taking a final exam in his class on information theory. Huffman coding provided the provably optimal solution to the problem.

In the early 1960s, Fano was involved in the development of time-sharing computers. From 1963 until 1968 Fano served as the founding director of MIT's Project MAC, which evolved to become what is now known as the MIT Computer Science and Artificial Intelligence Laboratory. He also helped to create MIT's original computer science curriculum.

In 1976, Fano received the Claude E. Shannon Award for his work in information theory. In 1977, he was recognized for his contribution to the teaching of electrical engineering with the IEEE James H. Mulligan Jr. Education Medal.

Fano retired from active teaching in 1984, and died on 13 July 2016 at the age of 98.

== Bibliography ==
In addition to his work in information theory, Fano also published articles and books about microwave systems, electromagnetism, network theory, and engineering education. His longer publications include:

- "The Theory of Microwave Filters" and "The Design of Microwave Filters", chapters 9 and 10 in George L. Ragan, ed., Microwave Transmission Circuits, vol. 9 in the Radiation Laboratory Series (with A. W. Lawson, 1948).
- Electromagnetic Energy Transmission and Radiation (with Lan Jen Chu and Richard B. Adler, 1960).
- Electromagnetic Fields, Energy, and Forces (with Chu and Adler, 1960).
- Fano, Robert (1961). Transmission of information: a statistical theory of communications. Cambridge, Mass: MIT Press. ISBN 978-0-262-56169-3. OCLC 804123877.
