= Error exponent =

Concept in computing

In information theory, the error exponent of a channel code or source code over the block length of the code is the rate at which the error probability decays exponentially with the block length of the code. Formally, it is defined as the limiting ratio of the negative logarithm of the error probability to the block length of the code for large block lengths. For example, if the probability of error $P_{\mathrm{error}}$ of a decoder drops as $e^{-n \alpha}$, where $n$ is the block length, the error exponent is $\alpha$. In this example, $\frac{-\ln P_{\mathrm{error}}}{n}$ approaches $\alpha$ for large $n$. Many of the information-theoretic theorems are of asymptotic nature, for example, the channel coding theorem states that for any rate less than the channel capacity, the probability of the error of the channel code can be made to go to zero as the block length goes to infinity. In practical situations, there are limitations to the delay of the communication and the block length must be finite. Therefore, it is important to study how the probability of error drops as the block length go to infinity.

Classical channel-coding exponents include achievability bounds, such as random-coding exponents, and converse bounds. For discrete memoryless channels, Suguru Arimoto gave a converse bound showing exponential decay of the correct decoding probability for rates above capacity.

== Error exponent in channel coding ==
=== For time-invariant DMC's ===
The channel coding theorem states that for any ε > 0 and for any rate less than the channel capacity, there is an encoding and decoding scheme that can be used to ensure that the probability of block error is less than ε > 0 for sufficiently long message block X. Also, for any rate greater than the channel capacity, the probability of block error at the receiver goes to one as the block length goes to infinity.

Assuming a channel coding setup as follows: the channel can transmit any of $M = 2^{nR} \;$ messages, by transmitting the corresponding codeword (which is of length n). Each component in the codebook is drawn i.i.d. according to some probability distribution with probability mass function Q. At the decoding end, maximum likelihood decoding is done.

Let $X_i^n$ be the $i$th random codeword in the codebook, where $i$ goes from $1$ to $M$. Suppose the first message is selected, so codeword $X_1^n$ is transmitted. Given that $y_1^n$ is received, the probability that the codeword is incorrectly detected as $X_2^n$ is:

$$P_{\mathrm{error}\ 1\to 2} = \sum_{x_2^n} Q(x_2^n)1(p(y_1^n\mid x_2^n) > p(y_1^n \mid x_1^n)).$$

The function $1(p(y_1^n\mid x_2^n)>p(y_1^n\mid x_1^n))$ has upper bound

$$\left(\frac{p(y_1^n\mid x_2^n)}{p(y_1^n\mid x_1^n)}\right)^s$$

for $s > 0 \;$ Thus,

$$P_{\mathrm{error}\ 1\to 2} \le \sum_{x_2^n} Q(x_2^n) \left(\frac{p(y_1^n\mid x_2^n)}{p(y_1^n\mid x_1^n)}\right)^s.$$

Since there are a total of M messages, and the entries in the codebook are i.i.d., the probability that $X_1^n$ is confused with any other message is $M$ times the above expression. Using the union bound, the probability of confusing $X_1^n$ with any message is bounded by:

$$P_{\mathrm{error}\ 1\to \mathrm{any}} \le M^\rho \left( \sum_{x_2^n} Q(x_2^n) \left(\frac{p(y_1^n\mid x_2^n)}{p(y_1^n\mid x_1^n)}\right)^{s}\right)^{\rho}$$

for any $0<\rho<1$. Averaging over all combinations of $x_1^n, y_1^n$:

$$P_{\mathrm{error}\ 1\to \mathrm{any}} \le M^\rho \sum_{y_1^n} \left(\sum_{x_1^n} Q(x_1^n)[p(y_1^n\mid x_1^n)]^{1-s\rho} \right) \left(\sum_{x_2^n} Q(x_2^n)[p(y_1^n\mid x_2^n)]^s\right)^{\rho}.$$

Choosing $s = 1-s\rho$ and combining the two sums over $x_1^n$ in the above formula:

$$P_{\mathrm{error}\ 1\to\mathrm{any}} \le M^\rho \sum_{y_1^n} \left(\sum_{x_1^n} Q(x_1^n)[p(y_1^n\mid x_1^n)]^{\frac{1}{1+\rho}}\right)^{1+\rho}.$$

Using the independence nature of the elements of the codeword, and the discrete memoryless nature of the channel:

$$P_{\mathrm{error}\ 1\to\mathrm{any}} \le M^\rho \prod_{i=1}^n \sum_{y_i} \left(\sum_{x_i} Q_i(x_i)[p_i(y_i\mid x_i)]^{\frac{1}{1+\rho}}\right)^{1+\rho}$$

Using the fact that each element of codeword is identically distributed and thus stationary:

$$P_{\mathrm{error}\ 1\to\mathrm{any}} \le M^\rho \left(\sum_y \left(\sum_x Q(x)[p(y\mid x)]^{\frac{1}{1+\rho}}\right)^{1+\rho}\right)^n.$$

Replacing M by 2^{nR} and defining

$$E_o(\rho,Q)= -\ln\left(\sum_{y} \left(\sum_{x} Q(x)[p(y\mid x)]^{1/(1+\rho)} \right)^{1+\rho}\right),$$

probability of error becomes

$$P_\mathrm{error} \le \exp(-n(E_o(\rho,Q) - \rho R)).$$

Q and $\rho$ should be chosen so that the bound is tighest. Thus, the error exponent can be defined as

$$E_{r}(R) = \max_Q \max_{\rho \in [0,1]} E_{o}(\rho,Q) - \rho R. \;$$

== Error exponent in source coding ==
=== For time invariant discrete memoryless sources ===
The source coding theorem states that for any $\varepsilon > 0$ and any discrete-time i.i.d. source such as $X$ and for any rate less than the entropy of the source, there is large enough $n$ and an encoder that takes $n$ i.i.d. repetition of the source, $X^{1:n}$, and maps it to $n.(H(X)+\varepsilon)$ binary bits such that the source symbols $X^{1:n}$ are recoverable from the binary bits with probability at least $1 - \varepsilon$.

Let $M=e^{nR}\,\!$ be the total number of possible messages. Next map each of the possible source output sequences to one of the messages randomly using a uniform distribution and independently from everything else. When a source is generated the corresponding message $M=m \,$ is then transmitted to the destination. The message gets decoded to one of the possible source strings. In order to minimize the probability of error the decoder will decode to the source sequence $X_1^n$ that maximizes $P(X_1^n\mid A_m)$, where $A_m\,$ denotes the event that message $m$ was transmitted. This rule is equivalent to finding the source sequence $X_1^n$ among the set of source sequences that map to message $m$ that maximizes $P(X_1^n)$. This reduction follows from the fact that the messages were assigned randomly and independently of everything else.

Thus, as an example of when an error occurs, supposed that the source sequence $X_1^n(1)$ was mapped to message $1$ as was the source sequence $X_1^n(2)$. If $X_1^n(1) \,$ was generated at the source, but $P(X_1^n(2)) > P(X_1^n(1))$ then an error occurs.

Let $S_i \,$ denote the event that the source sequence $X_1^n(i)$ was generated at the source, so that $P(S_i) = P(X_1^n(i)) \,.$ Then the probability of error can be broken down as $P(E) = \sum_i P(E\mid S_i) P(S_i)\, .$ Thus, attention can be focused on finding an upper bound to the $P(E\mid S_i)\,$.

Let $A_{i'} \,$ denote the event that the source sequence $X_1^n(i')$ was mapped to the same message as the source sequence $X_1^n(i)$ and that $P(X_1^n(i')) \geq P(X_1^n(i))$. Thus, letting $X_{i,i'}\,$ denote the event that the two source sequences $i \,$ and $i' \,$ map to the same message, we have that

$$P(A_{i'}) = P\left(X_{i,i'} \bigcap P(X_1^n(i')\right) \geq P(X_1^n(i)))\,$$

and using the fact that $P(X_{i,i'}) = \frac{1}{M}\,$ and is independent of everything else have that

$$P(A_{i'}) = \frac{1}{M} P(P(X_1^n(i')) \geq P(X_1^n(i)))\, .$$

A simple upper bound for the term on the left can be established as

$$\left [ P(P(X_1^n(i')) \geq P(X_1^n(i))) \right ] \leq \left ( \frac{P(X_1^n(i'))}{P(X_1^n(i))} \right ) ^s \,$$

for some arbitrary real number $s>0 \,.$ This upper bound can be verified by noting that $P(P(X_1^n(i')) > P(X_1^n(i))) \,$ either equals $1 \,$ or $0 \,$ because the probabilities of a given input sequence are completely deterministic. Thus, if $P(X_1^n(i')) \geq P(X_1^n(i)) \, ,$ then $\frac{P(X_1^n(i'))}{P(X_1^n(i))} \geq 1 \,$ so that the inequality holds in that case. The inequality holds in the other case as well because

$$\left ( \frac{P(X_1^n(i'))}{P(X_1^n(i))} \right ) ^s \geq 0 \,$$

for all possible source strings. Thus, combining everything and introducing some $\rho \in [0,1] \,$, have that

$$P(E\mid S_i) \leq P(\bigcup_{i \neq i'} A_{i'}) \leq \left ( \sum_{i \neq i'} P(A_{i'}) \right ) ^ \rho \leq \left ( \frac{1}{M} \sum_{i \neq i'} \left ( \frac{P(X_1^n(i'))}{P(X_1^n(i))} \right ) ^s \right ) ^ \rho \, .$$

Where the inequalities follow from a variation on the Union Bound. Finally applying this upper bound to the summation for $P(E) \,$ have that:

$$P(E) = \sum_i P(E\mid S_i) P(S_i) \leq \sum_i P(X_1^n(i)) \left ( \frac{1}{M} \sum_{i'} \left ( \frac{P(X_1^n(i'))}{P(X_1^n(i))} \right ) ^s \right ) ^ \rho \, .$$

Where the sum can now be taken over all $i' \,$ because that will only increase the bound. Ultimately yielding that

$$P(E) \leq \frac{1}{M^\rho} \sum_i P(X_1^n(i))^{1-s \rho} \left ( \sum_{i'} P(X_1^n(i'))^s \right ) ^\rho \, .$$

Now for simplicity let $1-s \rho = s \,$ so that $s= \frac{1}{1+\rho} \, .$ Substituting this new value of $s \,$ into the above bound on the probability of error and using the fact that $i' \,$ is just a dummy variable in the sum gives the following as an upper bound on the probability of error:

$$P(E) \leq \frac{1}{M^\rho} \left ( \sum_i P(X_1^n(i))^{\frac{1}{1+ \rho}} \right ) ^ {1+ \rho}  \, .$$

$M=e^{nR}\,\!$ and each of the components of $X_1^n(i) \,$ are independent. Thus, simplifying the above equation yields

$$P(E) \leq \exp \left( -n \left[ \rho R - \ln \left( \sum_{x_i} P(x_i)^{\frac{1}{1+ \rho}} \right)(1+\rho) \right] \right).$$

The term in the exponent should be maximized over $\rho \,$ in order to achieve the highest upper bound on the probability of error.

Letting $E_0( \rho) = \ln \left( \sum_{x_i} P(x_i)^{\frac{1}{1+ \rho}} \right)(1+\rho) \, ,$ see that the error exponent for the source coding case is:

$$E_r(R) = \max_{\rho \in [0,1]} \left[ \rho R - E_0(\rho) \right]. \,$$

== See also ==
- Source coding
- Channel coding
