= Channel capacity =

Information-theoretical limit on transmission rate in a communication channel

Channel capacity, in electrical engineering, computer science, and information theory, is the theoretical maximum rate at which information can be reliably transmitted over a communication channel.

Following the terms of the noisy-channel coding theorem, the channel capacity of a given channel is the highest information rate (in units of information per unit time) that can be achieved with arbitrarily small error probability.

Information theory, developed by Claude E. Shannon in 1948, defines the notion of channel capacity and provides a mathematical model by which it may be computed. The key result states that the capacity of the channel, as defined above, is given by the maximum of the mutual information between the input and output of the channel, where the maximization is with respect to the input distribution.

The notion of channel capacity has been central to the development of modern wireline and wireless communication systems, with the advent of novel error correction coding mechanisms that have resulted in achieving performance very close to the limits promised by channel capacity.

== Formal definition ==
The basic mathematical model for a communication system is the following:

$$\xrightarrow[\text{Message}]{W}
\begin{array}{|c|}\hline \text{Encoder} \\ f_n \\ \hline\end{array}
\xrightarrow[\mathrm{Encoded \atop sequence}]{X^n}
\begin{array}{|c|}\hline \text{Channel} \\ p(y|x) \\ \hline\end{array}
\xrightarrow[\mathrm{Received \atop sequence}]{Y^n}
\begin{array}{|c|}\hline \text{Decoder} \\ g_n \\ \hline\end{array}
\xrightarrow[\mathrm{Estimated \atop message}]{\hat W}$$

where:

- $W$ is the message to be transmitted;
- $X$ is the channel input symbol ($X^n$ is a sequence of $n$ symbols) taken in an alphabet $\mathcal{X}$;
- $Y$ is the channel output symbol ($Y^n$ is a sequence of $n$ symbols) taken in an alphabet $\mathcal{Y}$;
- $\hat{W}$ is the estimate of the transmitted message;
- $f_n$ is the encoding function for a block of length $n$;
- $p(y|x) = p_{Y|X}(y|x)$ is the noisy channel, which is modeled by a conditional probability distribution; and,
- $g_n$ is the decoding function for a block of length $n$.

Let $X$ and $Y$ be modeled as random variables. Furthermore, let $p_{Y|X}(y|x)$ be the conditional probability distribution function of $Y$ given $X$, which is an inherent fixed property of the communication channel. Then the choice of the marginal distribution $p_X(x)$ completely determines the joint distribution $p_{X,Y}(x,y)$ due to the identity

$$\ p_{X,Y}(x,y)=p_{Y|X}(y|x)\,p_X(x)$$

which, in turn, induces a mutual information $I(X;Y)$. The channel capacity is defined as

$$\ C = \sup_{p_X(x)} I(X;Y)\,$$

where the supremum is taken over all possible choices of $p_X(x)$.

== Additivity of channel capacity ==
Channel capacity is additive over independent channels. It means that using two independent channels in a combined manner provides the same theoretical capacity as using them independently. More formally, let $p_{1}$ and $p_{2}$ be two independent channels modelled as above; $p_{1}$ having an input alphabet $\mathcal{X}_{1}$ and an output alphabet $\mathcal{Y}_{1}$. Idem for $p_{2}$. We define the product channel $p_{1}\times p_2$ as $\forall (x_{1}, x_{2}) \in (\mathcal{X}_{1}, \mathcal{X}_{2}),\;(y_{1}, y_{2}) \in (\mathcal{Y}_{1}, \mathcal{Y}_{2}),\; (p_{1}\times p_{2})((y_{1}, y_{2}) | (x_{1},x_{2}))=p_{1}(y_{1}|x_{1})p_{2}(y_{2}|x_{2})$

This theorem states:
$$C(p_{1}\times p_{2}) = C(p_{1}) + C(p_{2})$$

Proof

We first show that $C(p_{1}\times p_{2}) \geq C(p_{1}) + C(p_{2})$.

Let $X_1$ and $X_2$ be two independent random variables. Let $Y_1$ be a random variable corresponding to the output of $X_1$ through the channel $p_{1}$, and $Y_2$ for $X_2$ through $p_2$.

By definition $C(p_{1}\times p_{2}) = \sup_{p_{X_{1},X_{2}}}(I(X_{1},X_{2} : Y_{1},Y_{2}))$.

Since $X_1$ and $X_2$ are independent, as well as $p_1$ and $p_2$, $(X_1,Y_1)$ is independent of $(X_2,Y_2)$. We can apply the following property of mutual information: $I(X_1,X_2 : Y_1, Y_2) = I(X_1:Y_1) + I(X_2:Y_2)$

For now we only need to find a distribution $p_{X_1,X_2}$ such that $I(X_1,X_2 : Y_1,Y_2) \geq I(X_1 : Y_1) + I(X_2 : Y_2)$. In fact, $\pi_1$ and $\pi_2$, two probability distributions for $X_1$ and $X_2$ achieving $C(p_1)$ and $C(p_2)$, suffice:

$$C(p_{1}\times p_{2}) \geq I(X_1, X_2 : Y_1, Y_2) = I(X_1:Y_1) + I(X_2:Y_2) = C(p_1) + C(p_2)$$

ie. $C(p_{1}\times p_{2}) \geq C(p_1) + C(p_2)$

Now let us show that $C(p_{1}\times p_{2}) \leq C(p_{1}) + C(p_{2})$.

Let $\pi_{12}$ be some distribution for the channel $p_{1}\times p_{2}$ defining $(X_1, X_2)$ and the corresponding output $(Y_1, Y_2)$. Let $\mathcal{X}_1$ be the alphabet of $X_1$, $\mathcal{Y}_1$ for $Y_1$, and analogously $\mathcal{X}_2$ and $\mathcal{Y}_2$.

By definition of mutual information, we have

$$\begin{align}
I(X_1, X_2 : Y_1, Y_2) &= H(Y_1, Y_2) - H(Y_1, Y_2 | X_1, X_2)\\
&\leq H(Y_1) + H(Y_2) - H(Y_1, Y_2 | X_1, X_2)
\end{align}$$

Let us rewrite the last term of entropy.

$H(Y_1,Y_2|X_1,X_2) = \sum_{(x_1, x_2) \in \mathcal{X}_1\times \mathcal{X}_2}\mathbb{P}(X_{1}, X_{2} = x_{1}, x_{2})H(Y_{1}, Y_{2} | X_{1}, X_{2} = x_{1}, x_{2})$

By definition of the product channel, $\mathbb{P}(Y_{1},Y_{2}=y_{1},y_{2}|X_{1},X_{2}=x_{1},x_{2})=\mathbb{P}(Y_{1}=y_{1}|X_{1}=x_{1})\mathbb{P}(Y_{2}=y_{2}|X_{2}=x_{2})$. For a given pair $(x_1, x_2)$, we can rewrite $H(Y_1,Y_2|X_1,X_2=x_1,x_2)$ as:

$$\begin{align}
H(Y_1, Y_2 | X_1, X_2 = x_1,x_2) &= \sum_{(y_1, y_2) \in \mathcal{Y}_1\times \mathcal{Y}_2}\mathbb{P}(Y_1, Y_2 = y_1, y_2 | X_1, X_2 = x_1, x_2)\log(\mathbb{P}(Y_1, Y_2 = y_1, y_2 | X_1, X_2 = x_1, x_2)) \\
&= \sum_{(y_1, y_2) \in \mathcal{Y}_1\times \mathcal{Y}_2}\mathbb{P}(Y_1, Y_2 = y_1, y_2 | X_1, X_2 = x_1, x_2)[\log(\mathbb{P}(Y_1 = y_1 | X_1 = x_1)) + \log(\mathbb{P}(Y_2 = y_2 | X_2 = x_2))] \\
&=H(Y_{1}|X_{1}=x_1)+H(Y_{2}|X_{2}=x_2)
\end{align}$$

By summing this equality over all $(x_1, x_2)$, we obtain $H(Y_1,Y_2|X_1,X_2)=H(Y_1|X_1)+H(Y_2|X_2)$.

We can now give an upper bound over mutual information:

$$\begin{align}
I(X_{1},X_{2}:Y_{1},Y_{2})&\leq H(Y_{1})+H(Y_{2})-H(Y_{1}|X_{1})-H(Y_{2}|X_{2})\\
&=I(X_{1}:Y_{1})+I(X_{2}:Y_{2})
\end{align}$$

This relation is preserved at the supremum. Therefore

$$C(p_{1}\times p_{2}) \leq C(p_1)+C(p_2)$$

Combining the two inequalities we proved, we obtain the result of the theorem:

$$C(p_{1}\times p_{2})=C(p_{1})+C(p_{2})$$

== Shannon capacity of a graph ==
If G is an undirected graph, it can be used to define a communications channel in which the symbols are the graph vertices, and two codewords may be confused with each other if their symbols in each position are equal or adjacent. The computational complexity of finding the Shannon capacity of such a channel remains open, but it can be upper bounded by another important graph invariant, the Lovász number.

== Noisy-channel coding theorem ==
The noisy-channel coding theorem states that for any error probability ε > 0 and for any transmission rate R less than the channel capacity C, there is an encoding and decoding scheme transmitting data at rate R whose error probability is less than ε, for a sufficiently large block length. Also, for any rate greater than the channel capacity, the probability of error at the receiver goes to 0.5 as the block length goes to infinity.

== Example application ==
An application of the channel capacity concept to an additive white Gaussian noise (AWGN) channel with B Hz bandwidth and signal-to-noise ratio S/N is the Shannon–Hartley theorem:

$$C = B \log_2 \left( 1+\frac{S}{N} \right)\$$

C is measured in bits per second if the logarithm is taken in base 2, or nats per second if the natural logarithm is used, assuming B is in hertz; the signal and noise powers S and N are expressed in a linear power unit (like watts or volts^{2}). Since S/N figures are often cited in dB, a conversion may be needed. For example, a signal-to-noise ratio of 30 dB corresponds to a linear power ratio of $10^{30/10} = 10^3 = 1000$.

== Channel capacity estimation ==
To determine the channel capacity, it is necessary to find the capacity-achieving distribution $p_X(x)$ and evaluate the mutual information $I(X;Y)$. Research has mostly focused on studying additive noise channels under certain power constraints and noise distributions, as analytical methods are not feasible in the majority of other scenarios. Hence, alternative approaches such as, investigation on the input support, relaxations and capacity bounds, have been proposed in the literature.

The capacity of a discrete memoryless channel can be computed using the Blahut-Arimoto algorithm.

Deep learning can be used to estimate the channel capacity. In fact, the channel capacity and the capacity-achieving distribution of any discrete-time continuous memoryless vector channel can be obtained using CORTICAL, a cooperative framework inspired by generative adversarial networks. CORTICAL consists of two cooperative networks: a generator with the objective of learning to sample from the capacity-achieving input distribution, and a discriminator with the objective to learn to distinguish between paired and unpaired channel input-output samples and estimates $I(X;Y)$.

== Channel capacity in wireless communications ==
This section focuses on the single-antenna, point-to-point scenario. For channel capacity in systems with multiple antennas, see the article on MIMO.

=== Bandlimited AWGN channel ===
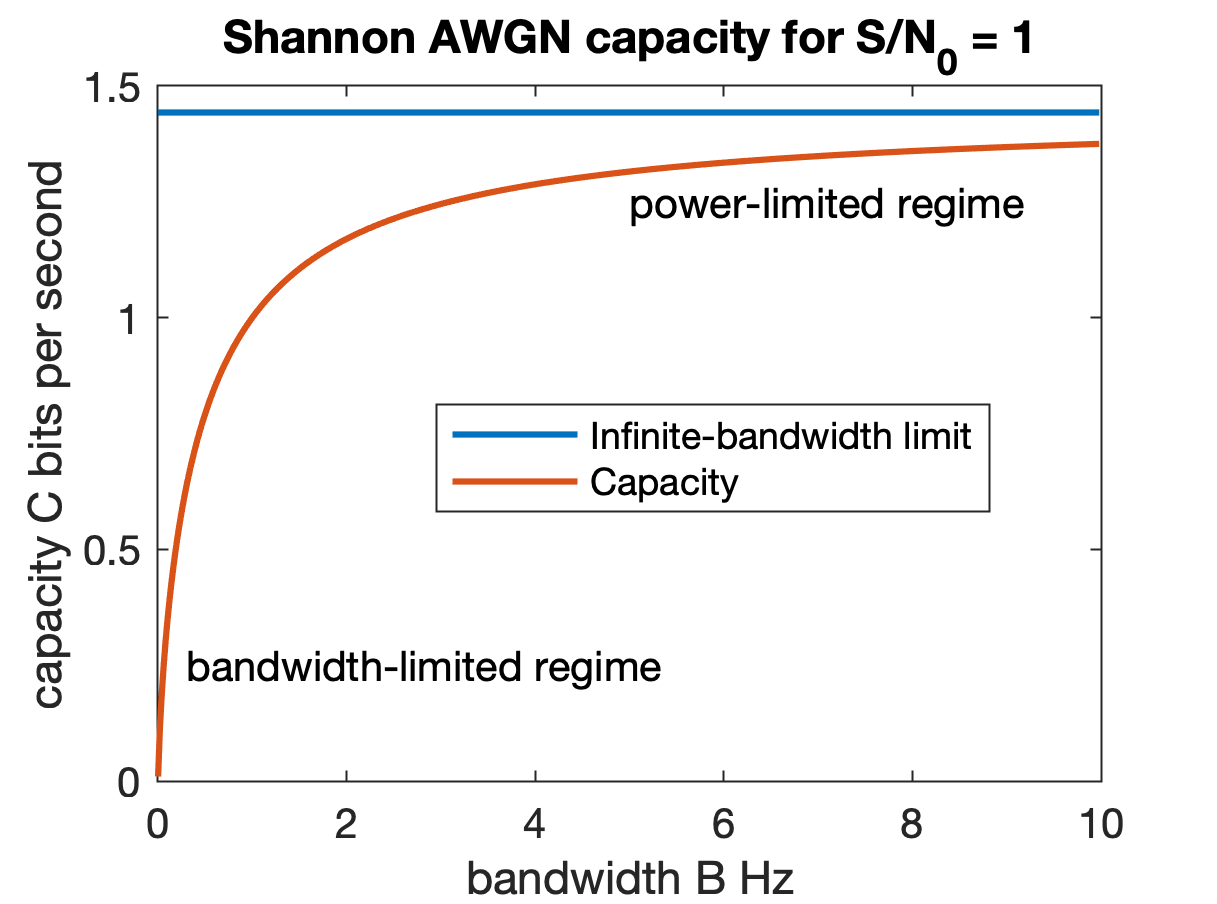
AWGN channel capacity with the power-limited regime and bandwidth-limited regime indicated. Here, $\frac{\bar{P}}{N_0}=1$; B and C can be scaled proportionally for other values.

If the average received power is $\bar{P}$ [W], the total bandwidth is $W$ in Hertz, and the noise power spectral density is $N_0$ [W/Hz], the AWGN channel capacity is

$C_{\text{AWGN}}=W\log_2\left(1+\frac{\bar{P}}{N_0 W}\right)$ [bits/s],

where $\frac{\bar{P}}{N_0 W}$ is the received signal-to-noise ratio (SNR). This result is known as the Shannon–Hartley theorem.

When the SNR is large (SNR ≫ 0 dB), the capacity $C\approx W\log_2 \frac{\bar{P}}{N_0 W}$ is logarithmic in power and approximately linear in bandwidth. This is called the bandwidth-limited regime.

When the SNR is small (SNR ≪ 0 dB), the capacity $C\approx \frac{\bar{P}}{N_0 \ln 2}$ is linear in power but insensitive to bandwidth. This is called the power-limited regime.

The bandwidth-limited regime and power-limited regime are illustrated in the figure.

=== Frequency-selective AWGN channel ===
The capacity of the frequency-selective channel is given by so-called water filling power allocation,

$$C_{N_c}=\sum_{n=0}^{N_c-1} \log_2 \left(1+\frac{P_n^* |\bar{h}_n|^2}{N_0} \right),$$

where $P_n^*=\max \left\{ \left(\frac{1}{\lambda}-\frac{N_0}{|\bar{h}_n|^2} \right),0 \right\}$ and $|\bar{h}_n|^2$ is the gain of subchannel $n$, with $\lambda$ chosen to meet the power constraint.

=== Slow-fading channel ===
In a slow-fading channel, where the coherence time is greater than the latency requirement, there is no definite capacity as the maximum rate of reliable communications supported by the channel, $\log_2 (1+|h|^2 SNR)$, depends on the random channel gain $|h|^2$, which is unknown to the transmitter. If the transmitter encodes data at rate $R$ [bits/s/Hz], there is a non-zero probability that the decoding error probability cannot be made arbitrarily small,

$$p_{out}=\mathbb{P}(\log(1+|h|^2 SNR)<R)$$,

in which case the system is said to be in outage. With a non-zero probability that the channel is in deep fade, the capacity of the slow-fading channel in strict sense is zero. However, it is possible to determine the largest value of $R$ such that the outage probability $p_{out}$ is less than $\epsilon$. This value is known as the $\epsilon$-outage capacity.

=== Fast-fading channel ===
In a fast-fading channel, where the latency requirement is greater than the coherence time and the codeword length spans many coherence periods, one can average over many independent channel fades by coding over a large number of coherence time intervals. Thus, it is possible to achieve a reliable rate of communication of $\mathbb{E}(\log_2 (1+|h|^2 SNR))$ [bits/s/Hz] and it is meaningful to speak of this value as the capacity of the fast-fading channel.

== See also ==
- Bandwidth (computing)
- Bit rate
- Code rate
- Cooperative diversity
- Error exponent
- MIMO
- Nyquist rate
- Negentropy
- Redundancy
- Sender, Data compression, Receiver
- Shannon–Hartley theorem
- Spectral efficiency
- Throughput
- Shannon capacity of a graph
