= John Wozencraft =

John McReynolds "Jack" Wozencraft (September 30, 1925 – August 31, 2009) was an electrical engineer and information theorist, professor emeritus at the Massachusetts Institute of Technology. One of the pioneers of coding theory, Wozencraft developed the sequential decoding techniques for convolutional codes that made error-free communication possible with relatively low computing power.

== Biography ==
He attended the U.S. Military Academy at West Point, NY. Following graduation in 1946, he joined the United States Army Signal Corps Engineering Laboratory. He received his Sc.D. at MIT in 1957. From 1957 to 1976, when he retired, he served on the faculty of MIT's department of Electrical Engineering.

While on a leave of absence from MIT (1972–1974), he served as Dean of Research at the Naval Postgraduate School in Monterey, California. Following his retirement from MIT in 1976, he returned to the Naval Postgraduate School as professor of electrical engineering and the founding chairman of a new interdisciplinary command, control, and communications academic group. He was appointed distinguished professor in 1985, and he retired in 1987.

In 1965, with Irwin M. Jacobs, Wozencraft co-authored Principles of Communication Engineering (ISBN 0881335541), a highly regarded textbook which is still widely used.

In 2006, Wozencraft was awarded the IEEE Alexander Graham Bell Medal.

He died on August 31, 2009, in Redmond, Washington.

== See also ==
- RPAL

Awards
Preceded by Jim K. Omura	IEEE Alexander Graham Bell Medal; 2006	Succeeded by Norman Abramson
