= Block error =

A block error is a common type of error in certain types of digital television transmission, particularly those that use image compression. Its presence in a television image is a telltale sign that 1) the signal is broadcast digitally, as this type of error can not occur in analog transmission, and 2) that there is a significant amount of noise, as digital television is designed to tolerate a certain amount of interference. Block errors are usually detected, but not corrected, by the receiving device and are commonly displayed as empty black boxes in the television image.

Because of how television images are usually compressed, a block error in a single frame often results in black boxes in several subsequent frames. In the worst case, a few block errors per frame could render the video from a television broadcast unviewable.

Block errors are most common in digital satellite television, where bad weather or motion of the satellite dish can cause interference outside the broadcaster's control.

Block errors can occur at levels of interference where an analog transmission would be fuzzy but still viewable. Thus, block errors are a fine example of the consequences of trade offs in engineering. Although in ideal conditions, digital transmission far exceeds analog transmission in performance, below a certain threshold of signal-to-noise ratio, digital transmission becomes untenable.
