= Möbius inversion formula =

Relation between pairs of arithmetic functions

In mathematics, the classic Möbius inversion formula is a relation between pairs of arithmetic functions, each defined from the other by sums over divisors. It was introduced into number theory in 1832 by August Ferdinand Möbius.

A large generalization of this formula applies to summation over an arbitrary locally finite partially ordered set, with Möbius' classical formula applying to the set of the natural numbers ordered by divisibility: see incidence algebra.

== Statement of the formula ==
The classic version states that if g and f are arithmetic functions satisfying

$$g(n)=\sum_{d \mid n}f(d)\quad\text{for every integer }n\ge 1$$

then

$$f(n)=\sum_{d \mid n}\mu(d)\,g\!\left(\frac{n}{d}\right)\quad\text{for every integer }n\ge 1$$

where μ is the Möbius function and the sums extend over all positive divisors d of n (indicated by $d \mid n$ in the above formulae). In effect, the original f(n) can be determined given g(n) by using the inversion formula. The two sequences are said to be Möbius transforms of each other.

The formula is also correct if f and g are functions from the positive integers into some abelian group (viewed as a Z-module).

In the language of Dirichlet convolutions, the first formula may be written as

$$g=\mathit{1}*f$$

where ∗ denotes the Dirichlet convolution, and 1 is the constant function 1(n) = 1. The second formula is then written as

$$f=\mu * g.$$

Many specific examples are given in the article on multiplicative functions.

The theorem follows because ∗ is (commutative and) associative, and 1 ∗ μ = ε, where ε is the identity function for the Dirichlet convolution, taking values ε(1) = 1, ε(n) = 0 for all n > 1. Thus

$$\mu * g = \mu * (\mathit{1} * f) = (\mu * \mathit{1}) * f = \varepsilon * f = f$$.

Replacing $f, g$ by $\ln f, \ln g$, we obtain the product version of the Möbius inversion formula:

$$g(n) = \prod_{d|n} f(d) \iff f(n) = \prod_{d|n} g\left(\frac{n}{d}\right)^{\mu(d)}, \forall n \geq 1.$$

== Series relations ==
Let

$$a_n=\sum_{d\mid n} b_d$$

so that

$$b_n=\sum_{d\mid n} \mu\left(\frac{n}{d}\right)a_d$$

is its transform. The transforms are related by means of series: the Lambert series

$$\sum_{n=1}^\infty a_n x^n = \sum_{n=1}^\infty b_n \frac{x^n}{1-x^n}$$

and the Dirichlet series:

$$\sum_{n=1}^\infty \frac {a_n} {n^s} = \zeta(s)\sum_{n=1}^\infty \frac{b_n}{n^s}$$

where ζ(s) is the Riemann zeta function.

== Repeated transformations ==
Given an arithmetic function, one can generate a bi-infinite sequence of other arithmetic functions by repeatedly applying the first summation.

For example, if one starts with Euler's totient function φ, and repeatedly applies the transformation process, one obtains:

1. φ the totient function
2. φ ∗ 1 = I, where I(n) = n is the identity function
3. I ∗ 1 = σ_{1} = σ, the divisor function

If the starting function is the Möbius function itself, the list of functions is:

1. μ, the Möbius function
2. μ ∗ 1 = ε where
  $$\varepsilon(n) = \begin{cases} 1, & \text{if }n=1 \\ 0, & \text{if }n>1 \end{cases}$$
  is the unit function
3. ε ∗ 1 = 1, the constant function
4. 1 ∗ 1 = σ_{0} = d = τ, where d = τ is the number of divisors of n, (see divisor function).

Both of these lists of functions extend infinitely in both directions. The Möbius inversion formula enables these lists to be traversed backwards.

As an example the sequence starting with φ is:

$$f_n =
\begin{cases}
\underbrace{\mu * \ldots * \mu}_{-n \text{ factors}} * \varphi & \text{if } n < 0 \\[8px]
\varphi & \text{if } n = 0 \\[8px]
\varphi * \underbrace{\mathit{1}* \ldots * \mathit{1}}_{n \text{ factors}} & \text{if } n > 0
\end{cases}$$

The generated sequences can perhaps be more easily understood by considering the corresponding Dirichlet series: each repeated application of the transform corresponds to multiplication by the Riemann zeta function.

== Generalizations ==
A related inversion formula more useful in combinatorics is as follows: suppose F(x) and G(x) are complex-valued functions defined on the interval [1, ∞) such that

$$G(x) = \sum_{1 \le n \le x}F\left(\frac{x}{n}\right)\quad\mbox{ for all }x\ge 1$$

then

$$F(x) = \sum_{1 \le n \le x}\mu(n)G\left(\frac{x}{n}\right)\quad\mbox{ for all }x\ge 1.$$

Here the sums extend over all positive integers n which are less than or equal to x.

This in turn is a special case of a more general form. If α(n) is an arithmetic function possessing a Dirichlet inverse α^{−1}(n), then if one defines

$$G(x) = \sum_{1 \le n \le x}\alpha (n) F\left(\frac{x}{n}\right)\quad\mbox{ for all }x\ge 1$$

then

$$F(x) = \sum_{1 \le n \le x}\alpha^{-1}(n)G\left(\frac{x}{n}\right)\quad\mbox{ for all }x\ge 1.$$

The previous formula arises in the special case of the constant function α(n) = 1, whose Dirichlet inverse is α^{−1}(n) = μ(n).

A particular application of the first of these extensions arises if we have (complex-valued) functions f(n) and g(n) defined on the positive integers, with

$$g(n) = \sum_{1 \le m \le n}f\left(\left\lfloor \frac{n}{m}\right\rfloor\right)\quad\mbox{ for all } n\ge 1.$$

By defining F(x) = f(⌊x⌋) and G(x) = g(⌊x⌋), we deduce that

$$f(n) = \sum_{1 \le m \le n}\mu(m)g\left(\left\lfloor \frac{n}{m}\right\rfloor\right)\quad\mbox{ for all } n\ge 1.$$

A simple example of the use of this formula is counting the number of reduced fractions 0 < a/b < 1, where a and b are coprime and b ≤ n. If we let f(n) be this number, then g(n) is the total number of fractions 0 < a/b < 1 with b ≤ n, where a and b are not necessarily coprime. (This is because every fraction a/b with gcd(a,b) = d and b ≤ n can be reduced to the fraction a/d/b/d with b/d ≤ n/d, and vice versa.) Here it is straightforward to determine g(n) = (n(n − 1))/2, but f(n) is harder to compute.

Another inversion formula is (where we assume that the series involved are absolutely convergent):

$$g(x) = \sum_{m=1}^\infty \frac{f(mx)}{m^s}\quad\mbox{ for all } x\ge 1\quad\Longleftrightarrow\quad
f(x) = \sum_{m=1}^\infty \mu(m)\frac{g(mx)}{m^s}\quad\mbox{ for all } x\ge 1.$$

As above, this generalises to the case where α(n) is an arithmetic function possessing a Dirichlet inverse α^{−1}(n):

$$g(x) = \sum_{m=1}^\infty \alpha(m)\frac{f(mx)}{m^s}\quad\mbox{ for all } x\ge 1\quad\Longleftrightarrow\quad
f(x) = \sum_{m=1}^\infty \alpha^{-1}(m)\frac{g(mx)}{m^s}\quad\mbox{ for all } x\ge 1.$$

For example, there is a well known proof relating the Riemann zeta function to the prime zeta function that uses the series-based form of Möbius inversion in the previous equation when $s = 1$. Namely, by the Euler product representation of $\zeta(s)$ for $\Re(s) > 1$

$$\log\zeta(s) = -\sum_{p\mathrm{\ prime}} \log\left(1-\frac{1}{p^s}\right) = \sum_{k \geq 1} \frac{P(ks)}{k} \iff P(s) = \sum_{k \geq 1} \frac{\mu(k)}{k} \log\zeta(ks), \Re(s) > 1.$$

These identities for alternate forms of Möbius inversion are found in. A more general theory of Möbius inversion formulas partially cited in the next section on incidence algebras is constructed by Rota in.

== Multiplicative notation ==
As Möbius inversion applies to any abelian group, it makes no difference whether the group operation is written as addition or as multiplication. This gives rise to the following notational variant of the inversion formula:

$$\mbox{if } F(n) = \prod_{d|n} f(d),\mbox{ then } f(n) = \prod_{d|n} F\left(\frac{n}{d}\right)^{\mu(d)}.$$

== Proofs of generalizations ==
The first generalization can be proved as follows. We use Iverson's convention that [condition] is the indicator function of the condition, being 1 if the condition is true and 0 if false. We use the result that

$$\sum_{d|n}\mu(d)=\varepsilon (n),$$

that is, $1 * \mu = \varepsilon$, where $\varepsilon$ is the unit function.

We have the following:

$$\begin{align}
\sum_{1\le n\le x}\mu(n)g\left(\frac{x}{n}\right)
&= \sum_{1\le n\le x} \mu(n) \sum_{1\le m\le \frac{x}{n}} f\left(\frac{x}{mn}\right)\\
&= \sum_{1\le n\le x} \mu(n) \sum_{1\le m\le \frac{x}{n}} \sum_{1\le r\le x} [r=mn] f\left(\frac{x}{r}\right)\\
&= \sum_{1\le r\le x} f\left(\frac{x}{r}\right) \sum_{1\le n\le x} \mu(n) \sum_{1\le m\le \frac{x}{n}} \left[m=\frac{r}{n}\right] \qquad\text{rearranging the summation order}\\
&= \sum_{1\le r\le x} f\left(\frac{x}{r}\right) \sum_{n|r} \mu(n) \\
&= \sum_{1\le r\le x} f\left(\frac{x}{r}\right) \varepsilon (r) \\
&= f(x) \qquad\text{since } \varepsilon (r)=0\text{ except when }r=1
\end{align}$$

The proof in the more general case where α(n) replaces 1 is essentially identical, as is the second generalisation.

== On posets ==
For a poset P, a set endowed with a partial order relation $\leq$, define the Möbius function $\mu$ of P recursively by

$$\mu(s,s) = 1 \text{ for } s \in P, \qquad \mu(s,u) = - \sum_{s \leq t < u} \mu(s,t), \quad \text{ for } s < u \text{ in } P.$$

(Here one assumes the summations are finite.) Then for $f,g: P \to K$, where K is a commutative ring, we have

$$g(t) = \sum_{s \leq t} f(s)  \qquad \text{ for all } t \in P$$

if and only if

$$f(t) = \sum_{s \leq t} g(s)\mu(s,t) \qquad \text{ for all }t \in P.$$

(See Stanley's Enumerative Combinatorics, Vol 1, Section 3.7.)

The classical arithmetic Mobius function is the special case of the poset P of positive integers ordered by divisibility: that is, for positive integers s, t, we define the partial order $s \preccurlyeq t$ to mean that s is a divisor of t. On the power set $\mathcal{P}(S)$ of a set $S$, ordered by $\subseteq$ (set inclusion), the Möbius inversion theorem reproduces the inclusion–exclusion principle, and on the set $\mathbb{N}$ of natural numbers with their standard (total) ordering by $\leq$ the theorem coincides with a discrete version of the fundamental theorem of calculus (See Stanley's Enumerative Combinatorics, Vol 1, Section 3.8). Across the sciences, many measures of interaction can be formulated as Möbius inversions on different posets. Examples include Shapley values in game theory, maximum entropy interactions in statistical mechanics, epistasis in genetics, and the interaction information, total correlation, and partial information decomposition from information theory.

== Contributions of Weisner, Hall, and Rota ==
The statement of the general Möbius inversion formula [for partially ordered sets] was first given independently by Weisner (1935) and Philip Hall (1936); both authors were motivated by group theory problems. Neither author seems to have been aware of the combinatorial implications of his work and neither developed the theory of Möbius functions. In a fundamental paper on Möbius functions, Rota showed the importance of this theory in combinatorial mathematics and gave a deep treatment of it. He noted the relation between such topics as inclusion-exclusion, classical number theoretic Möbius inversion, coloring problems and flows in networks. Since then, under the strong influence of Rota, the theory of Möbius inversion and related topics has become an active area of combinatorics.

== See also ==
- Farey sequence
- Inclusion–exclusion principle
