= Constraint (information theory) =

Constraint in information theory is the degree of statistical dependence between or among variables.

Garner provides a thorough discussion of various forms of constraint (internal constraint, external constraint, total constraint) with application to pattern recognition and psychology.

== See also ==
- Mutual Information
- Total Correlation
- Interaction information
