= Information inequality =

Information inequality may mean

- in statistics, the Cramér–Rao bound, an inequality for the variance of an estimator based on the information in a sample
- in information theory, inequalities in information theory describes various inequalities specific to that context.
- in sociology, the digital divide
