= Model scaling =

Model scaling may refer to:

- Applying a scale ratio to create a scale model, a physical representation of an object
- Scaling up a neural network; see neural scaling law
