= Aubrey William Ingleton =

English mathematician

Aubrey William Ingleton (1920–2000) was an English mathematician.

Ingleton was born in Chester, the son of an accountant. He joined the civil service at age 16, and during World War II was seconded to a radar development project. After the war, he entered Northern Polytechnic, and earned a B.Sc. in mathematics in 1949 as an external student at the University of London, winning first class honours, the Lubbock Prize, and the Sherbrooke Prize. He did his graduate studies in mathematics at King's College London under the supervision of Anthony Francis Ruston, on subjects related to the Hahn–Banach theorem. He took a faculty position at Birkbeck College in 1951, and married in 1952. In 1961 he moved to New College, Oxford, as the Mathematics Tutor. In 1966 he took up a Chair in Pure Mathematics at Cardiff University, but he returned to Oxford in 1967, becoming a fellow of Balliol College, where he remained for the rest of his career. Among his students at Oxford was Paul Seymour.

As a mathematician his works are related to many different topics in analysis, geometry, algebra, topology, combinatorics, and algebraic geometry. His work on matroids culminated in the paper "Representation of matroids" published in 1969. In his work, Ingleton studied matroids as a generalization of the concept of linear independence. The paper is a survey about representable matroids as it exhibited matroids representable over C but not over R and similarly over R but not over Q. He included in his paper a single theorem giving a necessary condition for the representability of matroids. This condition is known in the literature as Ingleton's inequality.

== Selected publications ==
1. ‘Hahn–Banach theorem for non-Archimedean-valued fields’. Proc. Cambridge Philos. Soc. 48 (1) (1952) 41–45.
2. ‘The Lorentz transformation’. Nature 171 (1953) 618.
3. ‘The rank f circulant matrices’. J. London Math. Soc. 31 (19569 455–460.
4. ‘A note on independence function and rank’. J. London Math. Soc. 34 (1959) 49–56.
5. (with D. B. Scott) ‘The tangent direction bundle of an algebraic variety and generalized Jacobians of linear systems’. Ann. Mat. Pura Appl. (4) 56 (1961) 359–373.
6. ‘A problem in linear inequalities’. Proc. London Math. Soc. (3) 16 (1966) 519–536.
7. ‘Tangent flag bundles and generalized Jacobian varieties I’. Atti. Accad. Naz. Lincei Cl. Sci. Fis. Mat. Natur. (8) 46 (1969) 323–329.
8. ‘Tangent flag bundles and generalized Jacobian varieties II’. Atti. Accad. Naz. Lincei Cl. Sci. Fis. Mat. Natur. (8) 46 (1969) 505–510.
9. ‘The linear complementary problem’. J. London Math. Soc. (2) 2 (1970) 330–336.
10. ‘Representation of matroids’. Combinatorial mathematics and its applications, Proc. Conf., Oxford, 1969 (Academic Press, London, 1971) 149–167.
11. ‘A geometrical characterization of transversal independence structures’. Bull. London Math. Soc. 3 (1971) 47–51.
12. ‘Conditions for representability and transversality of matroids’. Théorie des matroïdes (Rencontre Franco-Britannique, Brest, 1970), Lecture Notes in Mathematics 211 (Springer, Berlin, 1971) 62–66.
13. (with F. D. J. Dunstan and D. J. A. Welsh) ‘Supermatroids’. Combinatorics, Proc. Conf. Combinatorial Math., Math. Inst., Oxford, 1972 (Inst. Math. Appl., Southend-on-Sea, 1972) 72–122.
14. Notes on integration, revised edition (Mathematical Institute, Oxford University, Oxford, 1972).
15. (with M. J. Piff) ‘Gammoids and transversal matroids’. J. Combin. Theory Ser. B 15 (1973) 51–68.
16. (with S. A. Ilori and A. T. Lascu) ‘On a formula of D. B. Scott’. J. London Math. Soc. (2) 8 (1974) 539–544.
17. (with R. A. Main) ‘Non-algebraic matroids exist’. Bull. London Math Soc. 7 (1975) 144–146.
18. ‘Non-base-orderable matroids’. Proceedings of the Fifth British Combinatorial Conference (Univ. Aberdeen, Aberdeen, 1975). Congr. Numer. 15 (1976) 355–359.
19. (with J. A. Bondy) ‘Pancyclic graphs II’. J. Combin. Theory Ser. B 20 (1976) 41–46.
20. ‘Transversal matroids and related structures’. Higher combinatorics (Proc. NATO Advanced Study Inst., Berlin, 1976), NATO Adv. Sci. Inst. Ser. C Math. Phys. Sci. 31 (1977) 117–131.
21. (with S. A. Ilori) ‘Tangent flag bundles and Jacobian varieties I’. Atti Accad. Naz. Lincei Cl. Sci. Fis. Mat. Natur. (8) 67 (1979) 259–302.
22. (with S. A. Ilori) ‘Tangent flag bundles and Jacobian varieties II’. Atti Accad. Naz. Lincei Cl. Sci. Fis. Mat. Natur. (8) 68 (1980) 52–62.
23. (with S. A. Ilori) ‘Tangent flag bundles and Jacobian varieties III’. Atti Accad. Naz. Lincei Cl. Sci. Fis. Mat. Natur. (8) 68 (1980) 106–110.
24. ‘An introduction to nonstandard analysis’. Bull. Inst. Math. Appl. 18 (1982) 34–37.
