= Ingleton's inequality =

Property of rank functions of matroids

In mathematics, Ingleton's inequality is an inequality that is satisfied by the rank function of any representable matroid. In this sense it is a necessary condition for representability of a matroid over a finite field. For a matroid M and its rank function ρ, Ingleton's inequality states that for any subsets X_{1}, X_{2}, X_{3} and X_{4} in the support of M, the inequality

ρ(X_{1}) + ρ(X_{2}) + ρ(X_{1}∪X_{2}∪X_{3}) + ρ(X_{1}∪X_{2}∪X_{4}) + ρ(X_{3}∪X_{4}) ≤ ρ(X_{1}∪X_{2}) + ρ(X_{1}∪X_{3}) + ρ(X_{1}∪X_{4}) + ρ(X_{2}∪X_{3}) + ρ(X_{2}∪X_{4})

is satisfied.

Aubrey William Ingleton, an English mathematician, wrote an important paper in 1969 in which he surveyed the representability problem in matroids. Although the article is mainly expository, in this paper Ingleton stated and proved Ingleton's inequality, which has found interesting applications in information theory, matroid theory, and network coding.

== Importance of inequality ==
There are interesting connections between matroids, the entropy region and group theory. Some of those connections are revealed by Ingleton's Inequality.

Perhaps, the more interesting application of Ingleton's inequality concerns the computation of network coding capacities. Linear coding solutions are constrained by the inequality and it has an important consequence:

The region of achievable rates using linear network coding could be, in some cases, strictly smaller than the region of achievable rates using general network coding.

For definitions, see e.g.

== Proof ==
Theorem (Ingleton's inequality): Let M be a representable matroid with rank function ρ and let X_{1}, X_{2}, X_{3} and X_{4} be subsets of the support set of M, denoted by the symbol E(M). Then:

ρ(X_{1})+ρ(X_{2}) + ρ(X_{1}∪X_{2}∪X_{3}) + ρ(X_{1}∪X_{2}∪X_{4}) + ρ(X_{3}∪X_{4}) ≤ ρ(X_{1}∪X_{2}) + ρ(X_{1}∪X_{3}) + ρ(X_{1}∪X_{4}) + ρ(X_{2}∪X_{3}) + ρ(X_{2}∪X_{4}).

To prove the inequality we have to show the following result:

Proposition: Let V_{1},V_{2}, V_{3} and V_{4} be subspaces of a vector space V, then

1. dim(V_{1}∩V_{2}∩V_{3}) ≥ dim(V_{1}∩V_{2}) + dim(V_{3}) − dim(V_{1}+V_{3}) − dim(V_{2}+V_{3}) + dim(V_{1}+V_{2}+V_{3})
2. dim(V_{1}∩V_{2}∩V_{3}∩V_{4}) ≥ dim(V_{1}∩V_{2}∩V_{3}) + dim(V_{1}∩V_{2}∩V_{4}) − dim(V_{1}∩V_{2})
3. dim(V_{1}∩V_{2}∩V_{3}∩V_{4}) ≥ dim(V_{1}∩V_{2}) + dim(V_{3}) + dim(V_{4}) − dim(V_{1}+V_{3}) − dim(V_{2}+V_{3}) − dim(V_{1}+V_{4}) − dim(V_{2}+V_{4}) + dim(V_{1}+V_{2}+V_{3}) + dim(V_{1}+V_{2}+V_{4})
4. dim(V_{1}) + dim(V_{2}) + dim(V_{1}+V_{2}+V_{3}) + dim(V_{1}+V_{2}+V_{4}) + dim(V_{3}+V_{4}) ≤ dim(V_{1}+V_{2}) + dim(V_{1}+V_{3}) + dim(V_{1}+V_{4}) + dim(V_{2}+V_{3}) + dim(V_{2}+V_{4})

Where V_{i}+V_{j} represent the direct sum of the two subspaces.

Proof (proposition): We will use frequently the standard vector space identity: dim(U) + dim(W) = dim(U+W) + dim(U∩W).

1. It is clear that (V_{1}∩V_{2}) + V_{3} ⊆ (V_{1}+ V_{3}) ∩ (V_{2}+V_{3}), then

dim((V_{1}∩V_{2})+V_{3})	≤	dim((V_{1}+V_{2})∩(V_{2}+V_{3})),	hence

dim(V_{1}∩V_{2}∩V_{3})	=	dim(V_{1}∩V_{2}) + dim(V_{3}) − dim((V_{1}∩V_{2})+V_{3})
	≥	dim(V_{1}∩V_{2}) + dim(V_{3}) − dim((V_{1}+V_{3})∩(V_{2}+V_{3}))
	=	dim(V_{1}∩V_{2}) + dim(V_{3}) – {dim(V_{1}+V_{3}) + dim(V_{2}+V_{3}) – dim(V_{1}+V_{2}+V_{3})}
	=	dim(V_{1}∩V_{2}) + dim(V_{3}) – dim(V_{1}+V_{3}) − dim(V_{2}+V_{3}) + dim(V_{1}+V_{2}+V_{3})

2. It is clear that (V_{1}∩V_{2}∩V_{3}) + (V_{1}∩V_{2}∩V_{4}) ⊆ (V_{1}∩V_{2}), then

dim{(V_{1}∩V_{2}∩V_{3})+(V_{1}∩V_{2}∩V_{4})}	≤	dim(V_{1}∩V_{2}),	hence

dim(V_{1}∩V_{2}∩V_{3}∩V_{4})	=	dim(V_{1}∩V_{2}∩V_{3}) + dim(V_{1}∩V_{2}∩V_{4}) − dim{(V_{1}∩V_{2}∩V_{3}) + (V_{1}∩V_{2}∩V_{4})}
	≥	dim(V_{1}∩V_{2}∩V_{3}) + dim(V_{1}∩V_{2}∩V_{4}) − dim(V_{1}∩V_{2})

3. From (1) and (2) we have:

dim(V_{1}∩V_{2}∩V_{3}∩V_{4})	≥	dim(V_{1}∩V_{2}∩V_{3}) + dim(V_{1}∩V_{2}∩V_{4}) − dim(V_{1}∩V_{2})
	≥	dim(V_{1}∩V_{2}) + dim(V_{3}) − dim(V_{1}+V_{3}) − dim(V_{2}+V_{3}) + dim(V_{1}+V_{2}+V_{3}) + dim(V_{1}∩V_{2}) + dim(V_{4}) − dim(V_{1}+V_{4}) − dim(V_{2}+V_{4}) + dim(V_{1}+V_{2}+V_{4}) − dim(V_{1}∩V_{2})
	=	dim(V_{1}∩V_{2}) + dim(V_{3}) + dim(V_{4}) − dim(V_{1}+V_{3}) − dim(V_{2}+V_{3}) − dim(V_{1}+V_{4}) − dim(V_{2}+V_{4}) + dim(V_{1}+V_{2}+V_{3}) + dim(V_{1}+V_{2}+V_{3})

4. From (3) we have

dim(V_{1}+V_{2}+V_{3}) + dim(V_{1}+V_{2}+V_{4})	≤	dim(V_{1}∩V_{2}∩V_{3}∩V_{4}) − dim(V_{1}∩V_{2}) − dim(V_{3}) − dim(V_{4}) + dim(V_{1}+V_{3})+ dim(V_{2}+V_{3}) + dim(V_{1}+V_{4}) + dim(V_{2}+V_{4})

If we add (dim(V_{1})+dim(V_{2})+dim(V_{3}+V_{4})) at both sides of the last inequality, we get

dim(V_{1}) + dim(V_{2}) + dim(V_{1}+V_{2}+V_{3}) + dim(V_{1}+V_{2}+V_{4}) + dim(V_{3}+V_{4})	≤	dim(V_{1}∩V_{2}∩V_{3}∩V_{4}) − dim(V_{1}∩V_{2}) + dim(V_{1}+dim(V_{2}) + dim(V_{3}+V_{4}) − dim(V_{3}) − dim(V_{4}) + dim(V_{1}+V_{3}) + dim(V_{2}+V_{3}) + dim(V_{1}+V_{4}) + dim(V_{2}+V_{4})

Since the inequality dim(V_{1}∩V_{2}∩V_{3}∩V_{4}) ≤ dim(V_{3}∩V_{4}) holds, we have finished the proof.♣

Proof (Ingleton's inequality): Suppose that M is a representable matroid and let A = [v_{1} v_{2} … v_{n}] be a matrix such that M = M(A). For X, Y ⊆ E(M) = {1,2, …, n}, define U = <{V_{i} : i ∈ X }>, as the span of the vectors in V_{i}, and we define W = <{V_{j} : j ∈ Y }> accordingly.

If we suppose that U = <{u_{1}, u_{2}, … ,u_{m}}> and W = <{w_{1}, w_{2}, … ,w_{r}}> then clearly we have <{u_{1}, u_{2}, …, u_{m}, w_{1}, w_{2}, …, w_{r}}> = U + W.

Hence: r(X∪Y) = dim <{v_{i} : i ∈ X } ∪ {v_{j} : j ∈ Y }> = dim(V + W ).

Finally, if we define V_{i} = {v_{r} : r ∈ X_{i} } for i = 1,2,3,4, then by last inequality and the item (4) of the above proposition, we get the result.
