= Stationary ergodic process =

Stochastic process that exhibits both stationarity and ergodicity

In probability theory, a stationary ergodic process is a stochastic process which exhibits both stationarity and ergodicity. In essence this implies that the random process will not change its statistical properties with time and that its statistical properties (such as the theoretical mean and variance of the process) can be deduced from a single, sufficiently long sample (realization) of the process.

Stationarity is the property of a random process which guarantees that its statistical properties, such as the mean value, its moments and variance, will not change over time. A stationary process is one whose probability distribution is the same at all times. For more information see stationary process.

An ergodic process is one which conforms to the ergodic theorem. The theorem allows the time average of a conforming process to equal the ensemble average. In practice this means that statistical sampling can be performed at one instant across a group of identical processes or sampled over time on a single process with no change in the measured result. A simple example of a violation of ergodicity is a measured process which is the superposition of two underlying processes, each with its own statistical properties. Although the measured process may be stationary in the long term, it is not appropriate to consider the sampled distribution to be the reflection of a single (ergodic) process: The ensemble average is meaningless. Also see ergodic theory and ergodic process.

== See also ==
- Measure-preserving dynamical system
