= Conditional mutual information =

Information theory

Venn diagram of information theoretic measures for three variables $x$, $y$, and $z$, represented by the lower left, lower right, and upper circles, respectively. The conditional mutual informations $I(x;z|y)$, $I(y;z|x)$ and $I(x;y|z)$ are represented by the yellow, cyan, and magenta regions, respectively.

In probability theory, particularly information theory, the conditional mutual information is, in its most basic form, the expected value of the mutual information of two random variables given the value of a third.

== Definition ==
For random variables $X$, $Y$, and $Z$ with support sets $\mathcal{X}$, $\mathcal{Y}$ and $\mathcal{Z}$, we define the conditional mutual information as

$I(X;Y|Z) = \int_\mathcal{Z} D_{\mathrm{KL}}( P_{(X,Y)|Z} \| P_{X|Z} \otimes P_{Y|Z} ) dP_{Z}$.

This may be written in terms of the expectation operator: $I(X;Y|Z) = \mathbb{E}_Z [D_{\mathrm{KL}}( P_{(X,Y)|Z} \| P_{X|Z} \otimes P_{Y|Z} )]$.

Thus $I(X;Y|Z)$ is the expected (with respect to $Z$) Kullback–Leibler divergence from the conditional joint distribution $P_{(X,Y)|Z}$ to the product of the conditional marginals $P_{X|Z}$ and $P_{Y|Z}$. Compare with the definition of mutual information.

== In terms of PMFs for discrete distributions ==
For discrete random variables $X$, $Y$, and $Z$ with support sets $\mathcal{X}$, $\mathcal{Y}$ and $\mathcal{Z}$, the conditional mutual information $I(X;Y|Z)$ is as follows

$$I(X;Y|Z) = \sum_{z\in \mathcal{Z}} p_Z(z) \sum_{y\in \mathcal{Y}} \sum_{x\in \mathcal{X}}
p_{X,Y|Z}(x,y|z) \log \frac{p_{X,Y|Z}(x,y|z)}{p_{X|Z}(x|z)p_{Y|Z}(y|z)}$$

where the marginal, joint, and/or conditional probability mass functions are denoted by $p$ with the appropriate subscript. This can be simplified as

$I(X;Y|Z) = \sum_{z\in \mathcal{Z}} \sum_{y\in \mathcal{Y}} \sum_{x\in \mathcal{X}} p_{X,Y,Z}(x,y,z) \log \frac{p_Z(z)p_{X,Y,Z}(x,y,z)}{p_{X,Z}(x,z)p_{Y,Z}(y,z)}$.

== In terms of PDFs for continuous distributions ==
For (absolutely) continuous random variables $X$, $Y$, and $Z$ with support sets $\mathcal{X}$, $\mathcal{Y}$ and $\mathcal{Z}$, the conditional mutual information $I(X;Y|Z)$ is as follows

$$I(X;Y|Z) = \int_{\mathcal{Z}} \bigg( \int_{\mathcal{Y}} \int_{\mathcal{X}}
\log \left(\frac{p_{X,Y|Z}(x,y|z)}{p_{X|Z}(x|z)p_{Y|Z}(y|z)}\right) p_{X,Y|Z}(x,y|z) dx dy \bigg) p_Z(z) dz$$

where the marginal, joint, and/or conditional probability density functions are denoted by $p$ with the appropriate subscript. This can be simplified as

$I(X;Y|Z) = \int_{\mathcal{Z}} \int_{\mathcal{Y}} \int_{\mathcal{X}} \log \left(\frac{p_Z(z)p_{X,Y,Z}(x,y,z)}{p_{X,Z}(x,z)p_{Y,Z}(y,z)}\right) p_{X,Y,Z}(x,y,z) dx dy dz$.

== Some identities ==
Alternatively, we may write in terms of joint and conditional entropies as

$$\begin{align}
I(X;Y|Z) &= H(X,Z) + H(Y,Z) - H(X,Y,Z) - H(Z) \\
&= H(X|Z) - H(X|Y,Z) \\
&= H(X|Z)+H(Y|Z)-H(X,Y|Z).
\end{align}$$

This can be rewritten to show its relationship to mutual information

$$I(X;Y|Z) = I(X;Y,Z) - I(X;Z)$$

usually rearranged as the chain rule for mutual information

$$I(X;Y,Z) = I(X;Z) + I(X;Y|Z)$$

or

$$I(X;Y|Z) = I(X;Y) - (I(X;Z) - I(X;Z|Y))\,.$$

Another equivalent form of the above is

$$\begin{align}
I(X;Y|Z) &= H(Z|X) + H(X) + H(Z|Y) + H(Y) - H(Z|X,Y) - H(X,Y) - H(Z)\\
&= I(X;Y) + H(Z|X) + H(Z|Y) - H(Z|X,Y) - H(Z)
\end{align}\,.$$

Like mutual information, conditional mutual information can be expressed as a Kullback–Leibler divergence:

$$I(X;Y|Z) = D_{\mathrm{KL}}[ p(X,Y,Z) \| p(X|Z)p(Y|Z)p(Z) ].$$

Or as an expected value of simpler Kullback–Leibler divergences:

$$I(X;Y|Z) = \sum_{z \in \mathcal{Z}} p( Z=z ) D_{\mathrm{KL}}[ p(X,Y|z) \| p(X|z)p(Y|z) ]$$,
$$I(X;Y|Z) = \sum_{y \in \mathcal{Y}} p( Y=y ) D_{\mathrm{KL}}[ p(X,Z|y) \| p(X|Z)p(Z|y) ]$$.

== More general definition ==
A more general definition of conditional mutual information, applicable to random variables with continuous or other arbitrary distributions, will depend on the concept of regular conditional probability.

Let $(\Omega, \mathcal F, \mathfrak P)$ be a probability space, and let the random variables $X$, $Y$, and $Z$ each be defined as a Borel-measurable function from $\Omega$ to some state space endowed with a topological structure.

Consider the Borel measure (on the σ-algebra generated by the open sets) in the state space of each random variable defined by assigning each Borel set the $\mathfrak P$-measure of its preimage in $\mathcal F$. This is called the pushforward measure $X _* \mathfrak P = \mathfrak P\big(X^{-1}(\cdot)\big).$ The support of a random variable is defined to be the topological support of this measure, i.e. $\mathrm{supp}\,X = \mathrm{supp}\,X _* \mathfrak P.$

Now we can formally define the conditional probability measure given the value of one (or, via the product topology, more) of the random variables. Let $M$ be a measurable subset of $\Omega,$ (i.e. $M \in \mathcal F,$) and let $x \in \mathrm{supp}\,X.$ Then, using the disintegration theorem:

$$\mathfrak P(M | X=x) = \lim_{U \ni x}
\frac {\mathfrak P(M \cap \{X \in U\})}
{\mathfrak P(\{X \in U\})}
\qquad \textrm{and} \qquad \mathfrak P(M|X) = \int_M d\mathfrak P\big(\omega|X=X(\omega)\big),$$

where the limit is taken over the open neighborhoods $U$ of $x$, as they are allowed to become arbitrarily smaller with respect to set inclusion.

Finally we can define the conditional mutual information via Lebesgue integration:

$$I(X;Y|Z) = \int_\Omega \log
\Bigl(
\frac {d \mathfrak P(\omega|X,Z)\, d\mathfrak P(\omega|Y,Z)}
{d \mathfrak P(\omega|Z)\, d\mathfrak P(\omega|X,Y,Z)}
\Bigr)
d \mathfrak P(\omega),$$

where the integrand is the logarithm of a Radon–Nikodym derivative involving some of the conditional probability measures we have just defined.

== Note on notation ==
In an expression such as $I(A;B|C),$ $A,$ $B,$ and $C$ need not necessarily be restricted to representing individual random variables, but could also represent the joint distribution of any collection of random variables defined on the same probability space. As is common in probability theory, we may use the comma to denote such a joint distribution, e.g. $I(A_0,A_1;B_1,B_2,B_3|C_0,C_1).$ Hence the use of the semicolon (or occasionally a colon or even a wedge $\wedge$) to separate the principal arguments of the mutual information symbol. (No such distinction is necessary in the symbol for joint entropy, since the joint entropy of any number of random variables is the same as the entropy of their joint distribution.)

== Properties ==
=== Nonnegativity ===
It is always true that

$$I(X;Y|Z) \ge 0$$,

for discrete, jointly distributed random variables $X$, $Y$ and $Z$. This result has been used as a basic building block for proving other inequalities in information theory, in particular, those known as Shannon-type inequalities. Conditional mutual information is also non-negative for continuous random variables under certain regularity conditions.

=== Interaction information ===
Conditioning on a third random variable may either increase or decrease the mutual information: that is, the difference $I(X;Y) - I(X;Y|Z)$, called the interaction information, may be positive, negative, or zero. This is the case even when random variables are pairwise independent. Such is the case when:
$$X \sim \mathrm{Bernoulli}(0.5), Z \sim \mathrm{Bernoulli}(0.5), \quad Y=\left\{\begin{array}{ll} X & \text{if }Z=0\\ 1-X & \text{if }Z=1 \end{array}\right.$$
in which case $X$, $Y$ and $Z$ are pairwise independent and in particular $I(X;Y)=0$, but $I(X;Y|Z)=1.$ (Y here is the xor of X and Z so Z acts as the "secret key" for "plaintext" X and ciphertext "Y")

=== Chain rule for mutual information ===
The chain rule (as derived above) provides two ways to decompose $I(X;Y,Z)$:

$$\begin{align}
I(X;Y,Z) &= I(X;Z) + I(X;Y|Z) \\
&= I(X;Y) + I(X;Z|Y)
\end{align}$$

The data processing inequality is closely related to conditional mutual information and can be proven using the chain rule.

== Interaction information ==
The conditional mutual information is used to inductively define the interaction information, a generalization of mutual information, as follows:

$$I(X_1;\ldots;X_{n+1}) = I(X_1;\ldots;X_n) - I(X_1;\ldots;X_n|X_{n+1}),$$

where

$$I(X_1;\,...\,;X_{n-1}|X_n) = \mathbb{E}_{X_n} \bigl[I(X_1;\,...\,;X_{n-1})|X_n\bigr].$$

Because the conditional mutual information can be greater than or less than its unconditional counterpart, the interaction information can be positive, negative, or zero, which makes it hard to interpret.
