= Dual total correlation =

Measure of dependence

In information theory, dual total correlation, information rate, excess entropy, or binding information is one of several known non-negative generalizations of mutual information. While total correlation is bounded by the sum entropies of the n elements, the dual total correlation is bounded by the joint-entropy of the n elements. Although well behaved, dual total correlation has received much less attention than the total correlation. A measure known as "TSE-complexity" defines a continuum between the total correlation and dual total correlation.

== Definition ==
Venn diagram of information theoretic measures for three variables x, y, and z. The dual total correlation is represented by the union of the three mutual informations and is shown in the diagram by the yellow, magenta, cyan, and gray regions.

For a set of n random variables $\{X_1,\ldots, X_n\}$, the dual total correlation $D(X_1,\ldots, X_n)$ is given by

$$D(X_1,\ldots, X_n) = H\left( X_1, \ldots, X_n \right) - \sum_{i=1}^n H\left( X_i \mid X_1, \ldots, X_{i-1}, X_{i+1}, \ldots, X_n \right) ,$$

where $H(X_{1},\ldots, X_{n})$ is the joint entropy of the variable set $\{X_{1},\ldots, X_{n}\}$ and $H(X_i \mid \cdots )$ is the conditional entropy of variable $X_{i}$, given the rest.

== Normalized ==
The dual total correlation normalized between [0,1] is simply the dual total correlation divided by its maximum value $H(X_{1}, \ldots, X_{n})$,

$$ND(X_1,\ldots, X_n) = \frac{D(X_1,\ldots, X_n)}{H(X_1,\ldots, X_n)} .$$

== Relationship with Total Correlation ==
Dual total correlation is non-negative and bounded above by the joint entropy $H(X_1, \ldots, X_n)$.

$$0 \leq D(X_1, \ldots, X_n) \leq H(X_1, \ldots, X_n) .$$

Secondly, Dual total correlation has a close relationship with total correlation, $C(X_1, \ldots, X_n)$, and can be written in terms of differences between the total correlation of the whole, and all subsets of size $N-1$:

$$D(\textbf{X}) = (N-1)C(\textbf{X}) - \sum_{i=1}^{N} C(\textbf{X}^{-i})$$

where $\textbf{X} = \{X_1,\ldots, X_n\}$ and $\textbf{X}^{-i} = \{X_1,\ldots, X_{i-1}, X_{i+1},\ldots, X_n\}$

Furthermore, the total correlation and dual total correlation are related by the following bounds:

$$\frac{C(X_1, \ldots, X_n)}{n-1} \leq D(X_1, \ldots, X_n) \leq (n-1) \; C(X_1, \ldots, X_n) .$$

Finally, the difference between the total correlation and the dual total correlation defines a novel measure of higher-order information-sharing: the O-information:

$$\Omega(\textbf{X}) = C(\textbf{X}) - D(\textbf{X})$$.

The O-information (first introduced as the "enigmatic information" by James and Crutchfield is a signed measure that quantifies the extent to which the information in a multivariate random variable is dominated by synergistic interactions (in which case $\Omega(\textbf{X})<0$) or redundant interactions (in which case $\Omega(\textbf{X}) > 0$, and have found multiple applications in neuroscience.

== History ==
Han (1978) originally defined the dual total correlation as,

$$\begin{align}
& D(X_1,\ldots, X_n) \\[10pt]
\equiv {} & \left[ \sum_{i=1}^n H(X_1, \ldots, X_{i-1}, X_{i+1}, \ldots, X_n ) \right] - (n-1) \; H(X_1, \ldots, X_n) \; .
\end{align}$$

However Abdallah and Plumbley (2010) showed its equivalence to the easier-to-understand form of the joint entropy minus the sum of conditional entropies via the following:

$$\begin{align}
& D(X_1,\ldots, X_n) \\[10pt]
\equiv {} & \left[ \sum_{i=1}^n H(X_1, \ldots, X_{i-1}, X_{i+1}, \ldots, X_n ) \right] - (n-1) \; H(X_1, \ldots, X_n) \\
= {} & \left[ \sum_{i=1}^n H(X_1, \ldots, X_{i-1}, X_{i+1}, \ldots, X_n ) \right] + (1-n) \; H(X_1, \ldots, X_n) \\
= {} & H(X_1, \ldots, X_n) + \left[ \sum_{i=1}^n H(X_1, \ldots, X_{i-1}, X_{i+1}, \ldots, X_n ) - H(X_1, \ldots, X_n) \right] \\
= {} & H\left( X_1, \ldots, X_n \right) - \sum_{i=1}^n H\left( X_i \mid X_1, \ldots, X_{i-1}, X_{i+1}, \ldots, X_n \right)\; .
\end{align}$$

== See also ==
- Interaction information – Generalization of mutual information for more than two variables
- Mutual information – Measure of dependence between two variables
- Total correlation
- Hilberg's hypothesis – Power law growth of entropy of language or a stochastic process

== Bibliography ==
=== References ===
- Fujishige, Satoru (1978). "Polymatroidal dependence structure of a set of random variables". Information and Control. 39: 55–72. doi:10.1016/S0019-9958(78)91063-X.
- Varley, Thomas; Pope, Maria; Faskowitz, Joshua; Sporns, Olaf (2023). "Multivariate information theory uncovers synergistic subsystems of the human cerebral cortex". Communications Biology. 6 (1) 451. doi:10.1038/s42003-023-04843-w. PMC 10125999. PMID 37095282.
