= Data processing inequality =

Concept in information processing

The data processing inequality is an information theoretic concept that states that the information content of a signal cannot be increased via a local physical operation. This can be expressed concisely as 'post-processing cannot increase information'.

== Statement ==
Let three random variables form the Markov chain $X \rightarrow Y \rightarrow Z$, implying that the conditional distribution of $Z$ depends only on $Y$ and is conditionally independent of $X$. Specifically, we have such a Markov chain if the joint probability mass function can be written as

$$p(x,y,z) = p(x)p(y|x)p(z|y)=p(y)p(x|y)p(z|y)$$

In this setting, no processing of $Y$, deterministic or random, can increase the information that $Y$ contains about $X$. Using the mutual information, this can be written as :

$$I(X;Y) \geqslant I(X;Z),$$

with the equality $I(X;Y) = I(X;Z)$ if and only if $I(X;Y\mid Z)=0$. That is, $Z$ and $Y$ contain the same information about $X$, and $X \rightarrow Z \rightarrow Y$ also forms a Markov chain.

== Proof ==
One can apply the chain rule for mutual information to obtain two different decompositions of $I(X;Y,Z)$:

$$I(X;Z) + I(X;Y\mid Z) = I(X;Y,Z) = I(X;Y) + I(X;Z\mid Y)$$

By the relationship $X \rightarrow Y \rightarrow Z$, we know that $X$ and $Z$ are conditionally independent, given $Y$, which means the conditional mutual information, $I(X;Z\mid Y)=0$. The data processing inequality then follows from the non-negativity of $I(X;Y\mid Z)\ge0$.

== See also ==
- Garbage in, garbage out
