= Units of information =

Unit of measure for digital data

A unit of information is any unit of measure of digital data size. In digital computing, a unit of information is used to describe the capacity of a digital data storage device. In telecommunications, a unit of information is used to describe the throughput of a communication channel. In information theory, a unit of information is used to measure information contained in messages and the entropy of random variables.

Due to the need to work with data sizes that range from small to large, units of information cover a wide range of data sizes. Units are defined as multiples of a smaller unit except for the smallest unit which is based on convention and hardware design. Multiplier prefixes are used to describe relatively large sizes.

For binary hardware, the most common hardware today, the smallest unit is the bit, which represents a value that is one of two possibilities, typically shown as 0 and 1. The nibble, 4 bits, represents the value of a single hexadecimal digit. The byte (8 bits, 2 nibbles) is possibly the most commonly known and used base unit to describe data size. The word is a size that varies by and has a special importance for a particular hardware context. On modern hardware, a word is typically 2, 4 or 8 bytes, but the size varies dramatically on older hardware. Larger sizes can be expressed as multiples of a base unit via SI metric prefixes (powers of ten) or the newer and generally more accurate IEC binary prefixes (powers of two).

== Information theory ==
Comparison of units of information: bit, trit, nat, ban. Quantity of information is the height of bars. Dark green level is the "nat" unit.

In 1928, Ralph Hartley observed a fundamental storage principle, which was further formalized by Claude Shannon in 1945: the information that can be stored in a system is proportional to the logarithm of N possible states of that system, denoted log_{b} N. Changing the base of the logarithm from b to a different number c has the effect of multiplying the value of the logarithm by a fixed constant, namely log_{c} N = (log_{c} b) log_{b} N. Therefore, the choice of the base b determines the unit used to measure information. In particular, if b is a positive integer, then the unit is the amount of information that can be stored in a system with b possible states.

When b is 2, the unit is the shannon, equal to the information content of one "bit". A system with 8 possible states, for example, can store up to log_{2} 8 = 3 bits of information. Other units that have been named include:

Base b = 3
the unit is called "trit", and is equal to log_{2} 3 (≈ 1.585) bits.
Base b = 10
the unit is called decimal digit, hartley, ban, decit, or dit, and is equal to log_{2} 10 (≈ 3.322) bits.
Base b = e, the base of natural logarithms
the unit is called a nat, nit, or nepit (from Neperian), and is worth log_{2} e (≈ 1.443) bits.

The trit, ban, and nat are rarely used to measure storage capacity. But the nat, in particular, is often used in information theory, because natural logarithms are mathematically more convenient than logarithms in other bases.

== Units derived from bit ==
Several conventional names are used for collections or groups of bits.

=== Byte ===
Historically, a byte was the number of bits used to encode a character of text in the computer, which depended on computer hardware architecture, but today it almost always means eight bits – that is, an octet. An 8-bit byte can represent 256 distinct values, such as non-negative integers from 0 to 255, or signed integers from −128 to 127. The IEEE 1541-2002 standard specifies "B" (upper case) as the symbol for byte (IEC 80000-13 uses "o" for octet in French, but also allows "B" in English). Bytes, or multiples thereof, are almost always used to specify the sizes of computer files and the capacity of storage units. Most modern computers and peripheral devices are designed to manipulate data in whole bytes or groups of bytes, rather than individual bits.

=== Nibble ===
A group of four bits, or half a byte, is sometimes called a nibble, nybble or nyble. This unit is most often used in the context of hexadecimal number representations, since a nibble has the same number of possible values as one hexadecimal digit has.

=== Word, block, and page ===
Computers usually manipulate bits in groups of a fixed size, conventionally called words. The number of bits in a word is usually defined by the size of the registers in the computer's CPU, or by the number of data bits that are fetched from its main memory in a single operation. In the IA-32 architecture more commonly known as x86-32, a word is 32 bits, but other past and current architectures use words with 4, 8, 9, 12, 13, 16, 18, 20, 21, 22, 24, 25, 29, 30, 31, 32, 33, 35, 36, 38, 39, 40, 42, 44, 48, 50, 52, 54, 56, 60, 64, 72 bits or others.

Some machine instructions and computer number formats use two words (a "double word" or "dword"), or four words (a "quad word" or "quad").

Computer memory caches usually operate on blocks of memory that consist of several consecutive words. These units are customarily called cache blocks, or, in CPU caches, cache lines.

Virtual memory systems partition the computer's main storage into even larger units, traditionally called pages.

=== Multiplicative prefixes ===
A unit for a large amount of data can be formed using either a metric or binary prefix with a base unit. For storage, the base unit is typically a byte. For communication throughput, a base unit of bit is common. For example, using the metric kilo prefix, a kilobyte is 1000 bytes and a kilobit is 1000 bits.

Use of metric prefixes is common. In the context of computing, some of these prefixes (primarily kilo, mega and giga) are used to refer to the nearest power of two. For example, 'kilobyte' often refers to 1024 bytes even though the standard meaning of kilo is 1000.

Symbol	Prefix	Multiple
k	kilo	1000
M	mega	1000^{2}
G	giga	1000^{3}
T	tera	1000^{4}
P	peta	1000^{5}
E	exa	1000^{6}
Z	zetta	1000^{7}
Y	yotta	1000^{8}
R	ronna	1000^{9}
Q	quetta	1000^{10}

The International Electrotechnical Commission (IEC) standardized binary prefixes for binary multiples to avoid ambiguity through their similarity to the standard metric terms. These are based on powers of 1024, which is a power of 2.

Symbol	Prefix	Multiple	Example
Ki	kibi	2^{10}, 1024	kibibyte (KiB)
Mi	mebi	2^{20}, 1024^{2}	mebibyte (MiB)
Gi	gibi	2^{30}, 1024^{3}	gibibyte (GiB)
Ti	tebi	2^{40}, 1024^{4}	tebibyte (TiB)
Pi	pebi	2^{50}, 1024^{5}	pebibyte (PiB)
Ei	exbi	2^{60}, 1024^{6}	exbibyte (EiB)
Zi	zebi	2^{70}, 1024^{7}	zebibyte (ZiB)
Yi	yobi	2^{80}, 1024^{8}	yobibyte (YiB)
Ri	robi	2^{90}, 1024^{9}	robibyte (RiB)
Qi	quebi	2^{100}, 1024^{10}	quebibyte (QiB)

The JEDEC memory standard JESD88F notes that its inclusion of the definitions of kilo (K), mega (M) and giga (G) based on powers of two are included only to reflect common usage, but that these are otherwise deprecated.

== Size examples ==
- 1 bit: Answer to a yes/no question
- 1 byte: A number from 0 to 255
- 90 bytes: Enough to store a typical line of text from a book
- 512 bytes = 0.5 KiB: The typical sector size of an old style hard disk drive (modern Advanced Format sectors are 4096 bytes).
- 1024 bytes = 1 KiB: A block size in some older UNIX filesystems
- 2048 bytes = 2 KiB: A CD-ROM sector
- 4096 bytes = 4 KiB: A memory page in x86 (since Intel 80386) and many other architectures, also the modern Advanced Format hard disk drive sector size.
- 4 kB: About one page of text from a novel
- 120 kB: The text of a typical pocket book
- 1 MiB: A 1024×1024 pixel bitmap image with 256 colors (8 bpp color depth)
- 3 MB: A three-minute song (133 kbit/s)
- 650–900 MB – a CD-ROM
- 1 GB: 114 minutes of uncompressed CD-quality audio at 1.4 Mbit/s
- 16 GB: DDR5 DRAM laptop memory under $40 (as of early 2024); about $169 (as of early 2026) due to the 2025–present global memory supply shortage
- 32 GB: SODIMM DDR5 DRAM laptop memory for $377.99 (as of early 2026)
- 32/64/128 GB: Three common sizes of USB flash drives
- 1 TB: The size of a $30 hard disk (as of early 2024)
- 6 TB: The size of a $100 hard disk (as of early 2022)
- 12 TB game hard disk drive (for Xbox).
- 16 TB: The size of a small/cheap $130 (as of early 2024) enterprise SAS hard disk drive
- 26 TB: The size of $325 (as of early 2026) "video" hard disk drive
- 44 TB: Largest hard disk drive (as of as of March 2026, still only sold to data centers; 36 TB in Feb 2025 was then also only sold to data centers).
- 100 TB: Largest commercially available solid-state drive (as of mid-2024)
- 200 TB: Largest solid-state drive constructed (prediction for mid-2022)
- 1.6 PB (1600 TB): Amount of possible storage in one 2U server (world record as of 2021, using 100 TB solid-states drives).
- 1.3 ZB: Prediction of the volume of the whole internet in 2016

== Obsolete and unusual units ==
Some notable unit names that are today obsolete or only used in limited contexts.

- 1 bit: unibit
- 2 bits: dibit, crumb, quartic digit, quad, semi-nibble, nyp
- 3 bits: tribit, triad, triade
- 4 bits: see nibble
- 5 bits: pentad, pentade,
- 6 bits: byte (in early IBM machines using BCD alphamerics), hexad, hexade, sextet
- 7 bits: heptad, heptade
- 8 bits: octad, octade
- 9 bits: nonet, rarely used
- 10 bits: declet, decle
- 12 bits: slab
- 15 bits: parcel (on CDC 6600 and CDC 7600)
- 16 bits: doublet, wyde, parcel (on Cray-1), chawmp (on a 32-bit machine)
- 18 bits: chomp, chawmp (on a 36-bit machine)
- 32 bits: quadlet, tetra
- 64 bits: octlet, octa
- 96 bits: bentobox (in ITRON OS)
- 128 bits: hexlet, paragraph (on Intel x86 processors)
- 256 bytes: page (on Intel 4004, 8080 and 8086 processors, also many other 8-bit processors – typically much larger on many 16-bit/32-bit processors)
- 6 trits: tryte
- combit, comword

== See also ==
- File size
- ISO 80000-13 (Quantities and units – Part 13: Information science and technology)
