= Playte =

Playte may refer to:

- A member of the French electronic music band Dirtyphonics.
- A unit of information storage. See Units of information#Obsolete and unusual units.
