= Shannon (unit) =

Unit of information

The shannon (symbol: Sh) is a unit of information named after Claude Shannon, the founder of information theory. IEC 80000-13 defines the shannon as the information content associated with an event when the probability of the event occurring is 1/2. It is understood as such within the realm of information theory, and is conceptually distinct from the bit, a term used in data processing and storage to denote a single instance of a binary signal. A sequence of n binary symbols (such as contained in computer memory or a binary data transmission) is properly described as consisting of n bits, but the information content of those n symbols may be more or less than n shannons depending on the a priori probability of the actual sequence of symbols. (Note: Since the information associated with an event outcome that has a priori probability p, e.g. that a single given data bit takes the value 0, is given by H = −log p, and p can lie anywhere in the range 0 < p ≤ 1, the information content can lie anywhere in the range 0 ≤ H < ∞.)

The shannon also serves as a unit of the information entropy of an event, which is defined as the expected value of the information content of the event (i.e., the probability-weighted average of the information content of all potential events). Given a number of possible outcomes, unlike information content, the entropy has an upper bound, which is reached when the possible outcomes are equiprobable. The maximum entropy of n bits is n Sh. A further quantity that it is used for is channel capacity, which is generally the maximum of the expected value of the information content encoded over a channel that can be transferred with negligible probability of error, typically in the form of an information rate.

Nevertheless, the term bits of information or simply bits is more often heard, even in the fields of information and communication theory, rather than shannons; just saying bits can therefore be ambiguous. Using the unit shannon is an explicit reference to a quantity of information content, information entropy or channel capacity, and is not restricted to binary data, whereas bits can as well refer to the number of binary symbols involved, as is the term used in fields such as data processing.

== Similar units ==
The shannon is connected through constants of proportionality to two other units of information:

1 Sh ≈ 0.693 nat ≈ 0.301 Hart.

The hartley, a seldom-used unit, is named after Ralph Hartley, an electronics engineer interested in the capacity of communications channels. Although of a more limited nature, his early work, preceding that of Shannon, makes him recognized also as a pioneer of information theory. Just as the shannon describes the maximum possible information capacity of a binary symbol, the hartley describes the information that can be contained in a 10-ary symbol, that is, a digit value in the range 0 to 9 when the a priori probability of each value is 1/10. The conversion factor quoted above is given by log_{10}(2).

In mathematical expressions, the nat is a more natural unit of information, but 1 nat does not correspond to a case in which all possibilities are equiprobable, unlike with the shannon and hartley. In each case, formulae for the quantification of information capacity or entropy involve taking the logarithm of an expression involving probabilities. If base-2 logarithms are employed, the result is expressed in shannons, if base-10 (common logarithms) then the result is in hartleys, and if natural logarithms (base e), the result is in nats. For instance, the information capacity of a 16-bit sequence (achieved when all 65536 possible sequences are equally probable) is given by log(65536), thus log_{10}(65536) Hart ≈ 4.82 Hart, log_{e}(65536) nat ≈ 11.09 nat, or log_{2}(65536) Sh = 16 Sh.

== Information measures ==
In information theory and derivative fields such as coding theory, one cannot quantify the 'information' in a single message (sequence of symbols) out of context, but rather a reference is made to the model of a channel (such as bit error rate) or to the underlying statistics of an information source. There are thus various measures of or related to information, all of which may use the shannon as a unit.

For instance, in the above example, a 16-bit channel could be said to have a channel capacity of 16 Sh, but when connected to a particular information source that only sends one of 8 possible messages, one would compute the entropy of its output as no more than 3 Sh. And if one already had been informed through a side channel in which set of 4 possible messages the message is, then one could calculate the mutual information of the new message (having 8 possible states) as no more than 2 Sh. Although there are infinite possibilities for a real number chosen between 0 and 1, so-called differential entropy can be used to quantify the information content of an analog signal, such as related to the enhancement of signal-to-noise ratio or confidence of a hypothesis test.
