= File size =

Amount of data in or storage spaced used for a computer file

File size is a measure of how much data a computer file contains or how much storage space it is allocated. Typically, file size is expressed in units based on byte. A large value is often expressed with a metric prefix (as in megabyte and gigabyte) or a binary prefix (as in mebibyte and gibibyte).

== Slack space ==
Due to typical file system design, the amount of space allocated for a file is usually larger than the size of the file's data – resulting in a relatively small amount of storage space for each file, called slack space or internal fragmentation, that is not available for other files but is not used for data in the file to which it belongs.

Generally, a file system allocates space in blocks that are significantly larger than one byte. The file system allocates a number of blocks that together provide enough space to hold the file data. Unless the file fits exactly into the aggregated blocks, then some storage space allocated to the file is unused by the file.

A file's allocated storage size is sometimes referred to as file size or alternatively with qualification such as size on disk.

== See also ==
- Comparison of file systems
