= Transposed letter effect =

Psychological effect involving letters in a word

In psychology, the transposed letter effect is a phenomenon in which letters within a word are switched.

The phenomenon takes place when two letters in a word (typically called a base word) switch positions to create a new string of letters that form a new, non-word (typically called a transposed letter non-word or TL non-word). It is a form of priming because the transposed letter non-word is able to activate the lexical representation of its base word. A non-word that is created by transposing letters in a base word is significantly more effective at being a prime for that base word than would be a prime created by exchanging letters from the base word with random letters that were not originally in the base word. For example, the TL non-word stduent would be a more effective prime than would be the non-word stobent for the base word student.

Priming is an effect of implicit memory where exposure to a certain stimulus, event, or experience affects responding to a different stimulus. Typically, the event causes the stimulus to become more salient. The transposed letter effect can be used as a form of priming.

== Relevance ==
With any priming task the purpose is to test the initial stages of processing in order to better understand more complex processing. Psychologists use transposed-letter priming to test how people comprehend word meanings. From these findings, people can begin to understand how people learn, develop and understand language. Transposed-letter priming is used in a wide array of experiments and the reasons for using this method can depend on the particular hypothesis.

== Types ==
=== Close transpositions ===
Switching the position of adjacent letters in the base word is a close transposition. This type of transposition creates the greatest priming effect. For example, an effective prime for the word computer would be the TL non-word comptuer.

=== Distant transpositions ===
Forming a prime word by switching the position of nonadjacent letters in the base word is a distant transposition. There is significantly less priming effect in a distant transposition than a close transposition, no matter how distant the two letters are from each other. An example for computer would be the non-word ctompuer.

=== Transposed word effect ===
Switching the position of adjacent words in a base sentence (rather than word) is a transposed word effect. This transposition creates a great effect. For example, the white cat ran slowly becomes the cat white ran slowly. Participants are shown to take longer and were more error prone to reject the transposed word sentence than control sentence (e.g. the white cat ran helpfully). This type has been used to provide arguments in favour of parallel serial processing.

== History ==
The first to test the transposed-letter effects were Bruner and O'Dowd (1958) in a paper entitled, "A Note on the Informativeness of Parts of Words". However, their experiment did not use priming. They showed participants a word that had two letters switched either at the beginning, in the middle or at the end of the word. The researchers measured the response time for the participants to indicate what the word was. Bruner and O'Dowd found that having an error at the beginning of a word created the slowest response time, the end was the next slowest, and the middle was the fastest. They inferred that the beginning and the end were more important for word recognition than the middle. From there, the transposed letter effect was used to test how people process and recognize words using many tasks.

== In baboons ==
A study by Ziegler et al. (2013) demonstrated that baboons also show similar effects in regards to the transposed letter effect as humans. The purpose of the study was to find evidence to suggest that baboons use orthographic processing when reading. Previous research has considered transposed letter effects as strong evidence for orthographic processing (Grainger, 2008). Baboons were asked to classify strings of letters as either words or non-words by selecting certain shapes (for example, a circle for a word and a square for a non-word). The baboons were shown words they had previously learned and non-words. The non-words were created by using four-letter words, previously learned by the baboons, and either transposing the two middle letters or replacing the two middle letters with different letters (double substitute non-words). Baboons classified TL non-words as words significantly more often than double substitute non-words.

== Theories affected ==
=== Theories challenged by effects of transposed-letter priming ===
There are a number of theories that have been challenged by the effects shown with transposition-letter priming. These theories mainly have to do with how letters are used to process words.

Slot-based coding theory states that each letter in a word is connected to a particular location, or slot, within that word. One of the major theories that predict letter slots is the interactive activation model created by McClelland and Rumelhart (1981). This model assumes that people are letter-position specific when detecting words, so our recognition of words is based on what letters it contains, where the letters are placed within that word and the length of the word itself. Another example is the Bayesian reader model created by Norris (2006) which also assumes that the letters in a word are associated with their specific location. Many experiments (for example, Perea and Lupker, 2003) have shown if transposed-letter priming is used, (for example, priming judge with jugde) a priming effect will be seen, but if the prime is a word where two letters are changed to other letters (for example, priming judge with jupfe), there is no priming effect. According to the two models discussed, jugde would be assumed to be no more similar to judge than jupfe because the letters are not in the correct slots. In another experiment, TL non-words were more likely to be (incorrectly) classified as actual words than are nonsense control words (Andrews, 1996). Andrew's results are also inconsistent with the many slot-based coding models because even with two of the letters in the incorrect spot, they read the word as if spelled correctly.

The parallel distributed processing model proposed by Seidenberg and McClelland (1989) also uses a portion of words but instead of letters they are a small group of letters in the same order as in the word. For example, the word judge would have these groupings: _ju, jud, udg, dge, ge_. This predicts that if part of two words match there will be some priming, but this model still depends on the position of the letters to some extent, so it is not compatible with results from transposed-letter priming.

=== Theories supported by effect of transposed-letter priming ===
There are a number of theories that are supported by the results shown by the transposed-letter effect.

The SERIOL model (sequential encoding regulated by inputs to oscillations within letter units) described by Whitney (2001) explains processing of words as five levels, or nodes: retinal level, feature level, letter level, bigram level and word level. In the bigram level, the letters detected are turned into a number of pairs. For example, the word cart has the bigrams ca, ar, rt, cr, at and ct. The bigrams that more closely represent the location of letters in the words are given more weight. The pairs are then used to form the word. Within this model, letter location is still a factor but is not a defining feature of word processing, so the transposed-letter effect is consistent with this model.

In the SOLAR model (self-organizing lexical acquisition and recognition) described by Davis (1999) each letter is associated with its own level of activation. The first letter in the word has the highest level of activation and so on until the last letter has the lowest level of activation. In this model, position does describe the level of activation for that particular letter but because the activation is successive, two letters beside each other would have a similar activation level. The SOLAR model is consistent with the results of the transposed-letter effect priming because with this effect experiments have shown priming when two adjacent letters are switched but not when two letters farther apart in the word are switched.

Transposed-letter priming was used by Christianson, Johnson and Rayner (2005) on compound words to test the role of morphemes in word processing. They switched the letters either within the morphemes (for example, snowball to snowblal) or between morphemes (for example, snowball to snobwall) in the primes and found a greater priming effect within the morphemes than between. This supported the theory that morphemes are used during the processing of compound words because the priming effect was only reduced when the letters were switched over the morpheme boundary and were unable to separate into their separate parts.

== Internet meme ==
Typoglycemia (a portmanteau of typo and hypoglycemia) is a neologism for a purported discovery about the cognitive processes involved in reading text. The principle is that readers can comprehend text despite spelling errors and misplaced letters in the words. It is an urban legend and Internet meme that only appears to be correct.

The following example of typoglycemic text was circulated on the Internet in September 2003:

Aoccdrnig to a rscheearch at Cmabrigde Uinervtisy, it deosn't mttaer in waht oredr the ltteers in a wrod are, the olny iprmoetnt tihng is taht the frist and lsat ltteer be at the rghit pclae. The rset can be a toatl mses and you can sitll raed it wouthit porbelm. Tihs is bcuseae the huamn mnid deos not raed ervey lteter by istlef, but the wrod as a wlohe. (Note: Unscrambled: "According to a recshearch [sic] at Cambridge University, it doesn't matter in what order the letters in a word are, the only importent [sic] thing is that the first and last letter be at the right place. The rest can be a total mess and you can still read it without problem. This is because the human mind does not read every letter by itself, but the word as a whole.")

Some versions of the text end by saying "Such a cdonition is arppoiately cllaed Typoglycemia :)- Amzanig huh?"

Although the passage is littered with errors, it is still relatively easy to make out the words. However, the example doesn't distort shorter words, and the assertion that only lateral letters matter is untrue.

No such research was carried out at the University of Cambridge. These emails may have been inspired by a letter from Graham Rawlinson of the University of Nottingham to New Scientist in 1999 in which he discusses his 1976 Ph.D. thesis, or perhaps by the research of Thomas R. Jordan's group on the relative influences of the exterior and interior letters of words.

== See also ==
- Entropy (information theory)

== Sources ==
- Johnson R.L., Perea M. (2007). "Transposed-letter effects in reading: Evidence from eye movements and parafoveal preview". Journal of Experimental Psychology. 33 (1): 209–229. CiteSeerX 10.1.1.77.5646. doi:10.1037/0096-1523.33.1.209. PMID 17311489.
- Kinoshita, S. & Lupker, S. J., (2003). Chapter: Transposed-letter confusability effects in masked form priming. In M. Perea & S. J. Lupker (Eds.), Masked Priming: The State of the Art (97-120).
- Perea M., Duñabeitia J.A. & Carreiras M. (2007). Transposed-letter priming effects for close vs. distant transpositions. Universitat de València.
