= Differential entropy =

Concept in information theory

Differential entropy (also referred to as continuous entropy) in information theory is a property of absolutely continuous probability distributions which generalizes the Shannon entropy to continuous probability distributions.

In terms of measure theory, the differential entropy of a probability measure is the negative relative entropy from that measure to the Lebesgue measure, where the latter is treated as if it were a probability measure, despite being unnormalized.

== Definition ==
Let $X$ be a random variable with a probability density function $f$ whose support is a set $\mathcal X$. The differential entropy $h(X)$ or $h(f)$ is defined as

$h(X) = \operatorname{E}[-\log (f(X))] = -\int_\mathcal{X} f(x)\log f(x)\,dx$

For probability distributions which do not have an explicit density function expression, but have an explicit quantile function expression, $Q(p)$, then $h(Q)$ can be defined in terms of the derivative of $Q(p)$ i.e. the quantile density function $Q'(p)$ as

$$h(Q) = \int_0^1 \log Q'(p)\,dp.$$

As with its discrete analog, the units of differential entropy depend on the base of the logarithm, which is usually 2 (i.e., the units are bits). See logarithmic units for logarithms taken in different bases. Related concepts such as joint, conditional differential entropy, and relative entropy are defined in a similar fashion. Unlike the discrete analog, the differential entropy has an offset that depends on the units used to measure $X$. For example, the differential entropy of a quantity measured in millimeters will be log(1000) more than the same quantity measured in meters; a dimensionless quantity will have differential entropy of log(1000) more than the same quantity divided by 1000.

One must take care in trying to apply properties of discrete entropy to differential entropy, since probability density functions can be greater than 1. For example, the uniform distribution $\mathcal{U}(0,1/2)$ has negative differential entropy; i.e., it is better ordered than $\mathcal{U}(0,1)$ as shown now

$$\int_0^\frac{1}{2} -2\log(2)\,dx = -\log(2)\,$$

being less than that of $\mathcal{U}(0,1)$ which has zero differential entropy. Thus, differential entropy does not share all properties of discrete entropy.

The continuous mutual information $I(X;Y)$ has the distinction of retaining its fundamental significance as a measure of discrete information since it is actually the limit of the discrete mutual information of partitions of $X$ and $Y$ as these partitions become finer and finer. Thus it is invariant under non-linear homeomorphisms (continuous and uniquely invertible maps), including linear transformations of $X$ and $Y$, and still represents the amount of discrete information that can be transmitted over a channel that admits a continuous space of values.

For the direct analogue of discrete entropy extended to the continuous space, see limiting density of discrete points.

== Properties of differential entropy ==
- For probability densities $f$ and $g$, the Kullback–Leibler divergence $D_{KL}(f \parallel g)$ is greater than or equal to 0 with equality only if $f=g$ almost everywhere. Similarly, for two random variables $X$ and $Y$, $I(X;Y) \ge 0$ and $h(X\mid Y) \le h(X)$ with equality if and only if $X$ and $Y$ are independent.
- The chain rule for differential entropy holds as in the discrete case
  $$h(X_1, \ldots, X_n) = \sum_{i=1}^n h(X_i\mid X_1, \ldots, X_{i-1}) \leq \sum_{i=1}^{n} h(X_i).$$
- Differential entropy is translation invariant, i.e. for a constant $c$.
  $$h(X+c) = h(X)$$
- Differential entropy is in general not invariant under arbitrary invertible maps.
  In particular, for a constant $a$,
  $$h(aX) = h(X)+ \log |a|$$
  For a vector valued random variable $\mathbf{X}$ and an invertible (square) matrix $\mathbf{A}$
  $$h(\mathbf{A}\mathbf{X}) = h(\mathbf{X})+\log \left( \left|\det \mathbf{A}\right| \right)$$
- In general, for a transformation from a random vector to another random vector with same dimension $\mathbf{Y}=m \left(\mathbf{X}\right)$, the corresponding entropies are related via
  $$h(\mathbf{Y}) \leq h(\mathbf{X}) + \int f(x) \log \left\vert \frac{\partial m}{\partial x} \right\vert \, dx$$
  where $\left\vert \frac{\partial m}{\partial x} \right\vert$ is the Jacobian of the transformation $m$. The above inequality becomes an equality if the transform is a bijection. Furthermore, when $m$ is a rigid rotation, translation, or combination thereof, the Jacobian determinant is always 1, and $h(Y)=h(X)$.
- If a random vector $X \in \mathbb{R}^n$ has mean zero and covariance matrix $K$, $h(\mathbf{X}) \leq \frac{1}{2} \log(\det{2 \pi e K}) = \frac{1}{2} \log[(2\pi e)^n \det{K}]$ with equality if and only if $X$ is jointly gaussian (see below).

However, differential entropy does not have other desirable properties:

- It is not invariant under change of variables, and is therefore most useful with dimensionless variables.
- It can be negative.

A modification of differential entropy that addresses these drawbacks is the relative information entropy, also known as the Kullback–Leibler divergence, which includes an invariant measure factor (see limiting density of discrete points).

== Maximization in the normal distribution ==
=== Theorem ===
With a normal distribution, differential entropy is maximized for a given variance. A Gaussian random variable has the largest entropy amongst all random variables of equal variance, or, alternatively, the maximum entropy distribution under constraints of mean and variance is the Gaussian.

=== Proof ===
Let $g(x)$ be a Gaussian PDF with mean μ and variance $\sigma^2$ and $f(x)$ an arbitrary PDF with the same variance. Since differential entropy is translation invariant we can assume that $f(x)$ has the same mean of $\mu$ as $g(x)$.

Consider the Kullback–Leibler divergence between the two distributions
$$0 \leq D_{KL}(f \parallel g) = \int_{-\infty}^\infty f(x) \log \left( \frac{f(x)}{g(x)} \right) \, dx = -h(f) - \int_{-\infty}^\infty f(x)\log(g(x)) \, dx.$$
Now note that
$$\begin{align}
\int_{-\infty}^\infty f(x)\log(g(x)) \, dx &= \int_{-\infty}^\infty f(x)\log\left( \frac{1}{\sqrt{2\pi\sigma^2}}e^{-\frac{(x-\mu)^2}{2\sigma^2}}\right) \, dx \\
&= \int_{-\infty}^\infty f(x) \log\frac{1}{\sqrt{2\pi\sigma^2}} dx \,+\, \log(e)\int_{-\infty}^\infty f(x)\left( -\frac{(x-\mu)^2}{2\sigma^2}\right) \, dx \\
&= -\tfrac{1}{2}\log(2\pi\sigma^2) - \log(e)\frac{\sigma^2}{2\sigma^2} \\[1ex]
&= -\tfrac{1}{2}\left(\log(2\pi\sigma^2) + \log(e)\right) \\[1ex]
&= -\tfrac{1}{2}\log(2\pi e \sigma^2)  \\[1ex]
&= -h(g)
\end{align}$$
because the result does not depend on $f(x)$ other than through the variance. Combining the two results yields
$$h(g) - h(f) \geq 0 \!$$
with equality when $f(x) = g(x)$ following from the properties of Kullback–Leibler divergence.

=== Alternative proof ===
This result may also be demonstrated using the calculus of variations. A Lagrangian function with two Lagrangian multipliers may be defined as:

$$L = \int_{-\infty}^\infty g(x) \log(g(x)) \, dx - \lambda_0 \left(1-\int_{-\infty}^\infty g(x) \, dx\right) - \lambda \left(\sigma^2 - \int_{-\infty}^\infty g(x)(x-\mu)^2\,dx\right)$$

where g(x) is some function with mean μ. When the entropy of g(x) is at a maximum and the constraint equations, which consist of the normalization condition $\left(1=\int_{-\infty}^\infty g(x)\,dx\right)$ and the requirement of fixed variance $\left(\sigma^2 = \int_{-\infty}^\infty g(x)(x-\mu)^2\,dx\right)$, are both satisfied, then a small variation δg(x) about g(x) will produce a variation δL about L which is equal to zero:

$$0=\delta L=\int_{-\infty}^\infty \delta g(x) \left[\log(g(x)) + 1 + \lambda_0 + \lambda(x-\mu)^2\right]\,dx$$

Since this must hold for any small δg(x), the term in brackets must be zero, and solving for g(x) yields:

$$g(x) = e^{-\lambda_0 - 1 - \lambda (x-\mu)^2}$$

Using the constraint equations to solve for λ_{0} and λ yields the normal distribution:

$$g(x) = \frac{1}{\sqrt{2\pi\sigma^2}}e^{-\frac{(x-\mu)^2}{2\sigma^2}}$$

== Example: Exponential distribution ==
Let $X$ be an exponentially distributed random variable with parameter $\lambda$, that is, with probability density function

$$f(x) = \lambda e^{-\lambda x} \text{ for } x \geq 0.$$

Its differential entropy is then
$$\begin{align}
h_e(X)
&= -\int_0^\infty \lambda e^{-\lambda x} \log \left(\lambda e^{-\lambda x}\right) dx \\[2pt]
&= -\left(\int_0^\infty (\log \lambda)\lambda e^{-\lambda x}\,dx + \int_0^\infty (-\lambda x) \lambda e^{-\lambda x}\,dx\right) \\[2pt]
&= -\log \lambda \int_0^\infty f(x)\,dx + \lambda \operatorname{E}[X] \\[4pt]
&= -\log\lambda + 1\,.
\end{align}$$

Here, $h_e(X)$ was used rather than $h(X)$ to make it explicit that the logarithm was taken to base e, to simplify the calculation.

== Relation to estimator error ==
The differential entropy yields a lower bound on the expected squared error of an estimator. For any random variable $X$ and estimator $\widehat{X}$ the following holds:
$$\operatorname{E}[(X - \widehat{X})^2] \ge \frac{1}{2\pi e}e^{2h(X)}$$
with equality if and only if $X$ is a Gaussian random variable and $\widehat{X}$ is the mean of $X$.

== Differential entropies for various distributions ==
In the table below $\Gamma(x) = \int_0^{\infty} e^{-t} t^{x-1} dt$ is the gamma function, $\psi(x) = \frac{d}{dx} \log\Gamma(x)=\frac{\Gamma'(x)}{\Gamma(x)}$ is the digamma function, $B(p,q) = \frac{\Gamma(p)\Gamma(q)}{\Gamma(p+q)}$ is the beta function, and γ_{E} is Euler's constant.

Table of differential entropies
Distribution Name	Probability density function (pdf)	Differential entropy in nats	Support
Uniform	$f(x) = \frac{1}{b-a}$	$\log(b - a) \,$	$[a,b]\,$
Normal	$f(x) = \frac{1}{\sqrt{2\pi\sigma^2}} \exp\left(-\frac{(x-\mu)^2}{2\sigma^2}\right)$	$\log\left(\sigma\sqrt{2\pi e}\right)$	$(-\infty,\infty)\,$
Exponential	$f(x) = \lambda \exp\left(-\lambda x\right)$	$1 - \log \lambda \,$	$[0,\infty)\,$
Rayleigh	$f(x) = \frac{x}{\sigma^2} \exp\left(-\frac{x^2}{2\sigma^2}\right)$	$1 + \log \frac{\sigma}{\sqrt{2}} + \frac{\gamma_E}{2}$	$[0,\infty)\,$
Beta	$f(x) = \frac{x^{\alpha-1}(1-x)^{\beta-1}}{B(\alpha,\beta)}$ for $0 \leq x \leq 1$	$$\begin{align} \log B(\alpha,\beta) &- (\alpha-1)[\psi(\alpha) - \psi(\alpha +\beta)] \\ &- (\beta-1)[\psi(\beta) - \psi(\alpha + \beta)] \end{align}$$	$[0,1]\,$
Cauchy	$f(x) = \frac{\gamma}{\pi} \frac{1}{\gamma^2 + x^2}$	$\log(4\pi\gamma) \,$	$(-\infty,\infty)\,$
Chi	$f(x) = \frac{2}{2^{k/2} \Gamma(k/2)} x^{k-1} \exp\left(-\frac{x^2}{2}\right)$	$\log{\frac{\Gamma(k/2)}{\sqrt{2}}} - \frac{k-1}{2} \psi{\left(\frac{k}{2}\right)} + \frac{k}{2}$	$[0,\infty)\,$
Chi-squared	$f(x) = \frac{1}{2^{k/2} \Gamma(k/2)} x^{\frac{k}{2}\!-\!1} \exp\left(-\frac{x}{2}\right)$	$\log 2\Gamma{\left(\frac{k}{2}\right)} - \left(1 - \frac{k}{2}\right) \psi{\left(\frac{k}{2}\right)} + \frac{k}{2}$	$[0,\infty)\,$
Erlang	$f(x) = \frac{\lambda^k}{(k-1)!} x^{k-1} \exp(-\lambda x)$	$\left(1-k\right) \psi(k) + \log \frac{\Gamma(k)}{\lambda} + k$	$[0,\infty)\,$
F	$f(x) = \frac{n_1^{{n_1}/{2}} \, n_2^{{n_2}/{2}}}{B{\left(\frac{n_1}{2},\frac{n_2}{2}\right)}} \frac{x^{\frac{n_1}{2} - 1}}{{\left(n_2 + n_1 x\right)}^{\frac{n_1 + n2}{2}}}$	$$\begin{align} &\log \frac{n_1}{n_2} B{\left(\frac{n_1}{2},\frac{n_2}{2}\right)} \\[4pt] &+ \left(1 - \frac{n_1}{2}\right) \psi{\left(\frac{n_1}{2}\right)} \\[4pt] &- \left(1 + \frac{n_2}{2}\right)\psi{\left(\frac{n_2}{2}\right)} \\[4pt] &+ \frac{n_1 + n_2}{2} \psi{\left(\frac{n_1\!+\!n_2}{2}\right)} \end{align}$$	$[0,\infty)\,$
Gamma	$f(x) = \frac{x^{k - 1} \exp(-\frac{x}{\theta})}{\theta^k \Gamma(k)}$	$\log(\theta \Gamma(k)) + \left(1 - k\right) \psi(k) + k$	$[0,\infty)\,$
Laplace	$f(x) = \frac{1}{2b} \exp\left(-\frac{|x - \mu|}{b}\right)$	$1 + \log(2b) \,$	$(-\infty,\infty)\,$
Logistic	$f(x) = \frac{e^{-x/s}}{s{\left(1 + e^{-x/s}\right)}^2}$	$\log s + 2 \,$	$(-\infty,\infty)\,$
Lognormal	$f(x) = \frac{1}{\sigma x \sqrt{2\pi}} \exp\left(-\frac{(\log x - \mu)^2}{2\sigma^2}\right)$	$\mu + \tfrac{1}{2} \log(2\pi e \sigma^2)$	$[0,\infty)\,$
Maxwell–Boltzmann	$f(x) = \frac{1}{a^3}\sqrt{\frac{2}{\pi}}\,x^{2}\exp\left(-\frac{x^2}{2a^2}\right)$	$\log(a\sqrt{2\pi}) + \gamma_E - \tfrac{1}{2}$	$[0,\infty)\,$
Generalized normal	$f(x) = \frac{2 \beta^{\frac{\alpha}{2}}}{\Gamma(\frac{\alpha}{2})} x^{\alpha - 1} \exp\left(-\beta x^2\right)$	$\log{\frac{\Gamma(\alpha/2)}{2\beta^{\frac{1}{2}}}} - \frac{\alpha - 1}{2} \psi\left(\frac{\alpha}{2}\right) + \frac{\alpha}{2}$	$(-\infty,\infty)\,$
Pareto	$f(x) = \frac{\alpha x_m^\alpha}{x^{\alpha+1}}$	$\log \frac{x_m}{\alpha} + 1 + \frac{1}{\alpha}$	$[x_m,\infty)\,$
Student's t	$f(x) = \frac{(1 + x^2/\nu)^{-\frac{\nu+1}{2}}}{\sqrt{\nu}B(\frac{1}{2},\frac{\nu}{2})}$	$$\begin{align} &\frac{\nu\!+\!1}{2} \left[\psi{\left(\frac{\nu\!+\!1}{2}\right)} - \psi{\left(\frac{\nu}{2}\right)}\right]\\ &+\!\log \sqrt{\nu} B{\left(\frac{1}{2},\frac{\nu}{2}\right)} \end{align}$$	$(-\infty,\infty)\,$
Triangular	$$f(x) = \begin{cases} \frac{2(x-a)}{(b-a)(c-a)} & \mathrm{for\ } a \le x \leq c, \\[4pt] \frac{2(b-x)}{(b-a)(b-c)} & \mathrm{for\ } c < x \le b, \\[4pt] \end{cases}$$	$\frac{1}{2} + \log \frac{b-a}{2}$	$[a,b]\,$
Weibull	$f(x) = \frac{k}{\lambda^k} x^{k-1} \exp\left(-\frac{x^k}{\lambda^k}\right)$	$\frac{k-1}{k}\gamma_E + \log \frac{\lambda}{k} + 1$	$[0,\infty)\,$
Multivariate normal	$f_X(\mathbf{x}) = \frac{\exp \left[ -\frac{1}{2} ( \mathbf{x} - \mathbf{\mu})^\mathsf{T} \Sigma^{-1} (\mathbf{x} - \mathbf{\mu}) \right]} {{\left(2\pi\right)}^{N/2} \left|\Sigma\right|^{1/2}}$	$\tfrac{1}{2} \log\left[(2\pi e)^N \det(\Sigma)\right]$	$\mathbb{R}^N$

Many of the differential entropies are from.

== Variants ==
Differential entropy is also not invariant under continuous coordinate transformations. It also does not share all properties of discrete entropy. For example, it may be negative. Instead of differential entropy, one may deduce the limit of discrete entropy as calculated on an increasingly dense set of points. The expression thus attained will be non-negative, and allow for coordinate-free descriptions of entropy.

This modification of differential entropy differs by requiring a measure $m(x)$. The expression is as follows:

$$D(p\parallel m) = \int p(x)\log\frac{p(x)}{m(x)}\,dx.$$

If $m(x)$ is a probability density, this is the Kullback–Leibler divergence and is when non-negativity holds. When performing coordinate transformations, both $p(x)$ and $m(x)$ are transformed. The value calculated will then remain constant.

The definition of differential entropy above can be obtained by partitioning the range of $X$ into bins of length $h$ with associated sample points $ih$ within the bins, for $X$ Riemann integrable. This gives a quantized version of $X$, defined by $X_h = ih$ if $ih \le X \le (i+1)h$. Then the entropy of $X_h = ih$ is

$$H_h=-\sum_i hf(ih)\log (f(ih)) - \sum hf(ih)\log(h).$$

The first term on the right approximates the differential entropy, while the second term is approximately $-\log(h)$. Note that this procedure suggests that the entropy in the discrete sense of a continuous random variable should be $\infty$.

== See also ==
- Information entropy
- Self-information
- Entropy estimation
