= Nat (unit) =

Unit of information

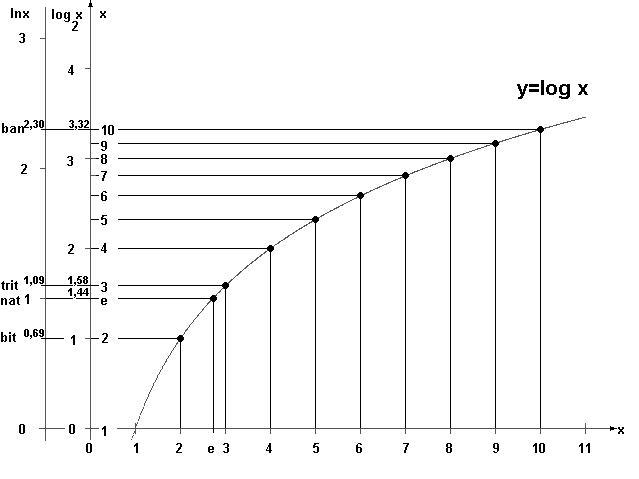
Units of information measurement.

The natural unit of information (symbol: nat), sometimes also nit or nepit, is a unit of information or information entropy, based on natural logarithms and powers of e, rather than the powers of 2 and base 2 logarithms, which define the shannon. This unit is also known by its unit symbol, the nat. One nat is the information content of an event when the probability of that event occurring is 1/e.

One nat is equal to 1/(ln 2) shannons ≈ 1.44 Sh or, equivalently, 1/(ln 10) hartleys ≈ 0.434 Hart.

== History ==
Boulton and Wallace used the term nit in conjunction with minimum message length, which was subsequently changed by the minimum description length community to nat to avoid confusion with the nit used as a unit of luminance.

Alan Turing used the term natural ban with the same meaning.

== Entropy ==
Shannon entropy (information entropy), being the expected value of the information of an event, is inherently a quantity of the same type and with a unit of information. The International System of Units, by assigning the same unit (joule per kelvin) both to heat capacity and to thermodynamic entropy implicitly treats information entropy as a quantity of dimension one, with 1 nat = 1. (Note: This implicitly also makes the nat the coherent unit of information in the SI.) Systems of natural units that normalize the Boltzmann constant to 1 are effectively measuring thermodynamic entropy with the nat as unit.

When the Shannon entropy is written using a natural logarithm,
$$\Eta = - \sum_i p_i \ln p_i$$
it is implicitly giving a quantity with nat as the unit.

== See also ==
- Perplexity
